= Triathlon at the SEA Games =

Triathlon has been contested at the Southeast Asian Games eight times, in 2005, 2007, 2015, 2017, 2019, 2021, 2023 and 2025.

== Medalists ==
=== Men's Individual ===
==== Triathlon ====
Games	Gold	Silver	Bronze
2005 Philippines	Cheng Jing Hean (SGP)	Loh Yeong Shang (MAS)	Arland Macasieb (PHI)
2007 Thailand	Mok Ying Ren (SGP)	George Vilog (PHI)	Arland Macasieb (PHI)
2015 Singapore	Nikko Bryan Huelgas (PHI)	Rikigoro Shinozuka (MAS)	Loo Chuan Rong (SGP)
2017 Malaysia	Nikko Bryan Huelgas (PHI)	John Leerams Chicano (PHI)	Clement Chow Sheng Ren (SGP)
2019 Philippines	John Leerams Chicano (PHI)	Andrew Kim Remolino (PHI)	Muhammad Ahlul Firman (INA)
2021 Vietnam	Fernando Jose Casares (PHI)	Andrew Kim Remolino (PHI)	Ronald Setiawan Bintang (INA)
2023 Cambodia	Fernando Jose Casares (PHI)	Rashif Amila Yaqin (INA)	Andrew Kim Remolino (PHI)
2025 Thailand	Rashif Amila Yaqin (INA)	Andrew Kim Remolino (PHI)	Fernando Jose Casares (PHI)

==== Duathlon ====
Games	Gold	Silver	Bronze
2005 Philippines	Not Held		
2007 Nakhon Ratchasima	Ryan Mendoza (PHI)	Amnat Srichat (THA)	August Benedicto (PHI)
2015 Singapore	Not Held		
2017 Malaysia	Not Held		
2019 Philippines	Jauhari Johan (INA)	Joey Delos Reyes (PHI)	Nattawut Srinate (THA)
2021 Vietnam	Phạm Tiến Sản (VIE)	Rudi Febriade (INA)	Jauhari Johan (INA)
2023 Cambodia	Phạm Tiến Sản (VIE)	Sokha Michael Chaumond (CAM)	Sedilta Pilon Nubatonis (INA)

==== Aquathlon ====
Games	Gold	Silver	Bronze
2023 Cambodia	Rashif Amila Yaqin (INA)	Andrew Kim Remolino (PHI)	Bryce Sheng Cher Chong (SGP)

=== Women's Individual ===
==== Triathlon ====
Games	Gold	Silver	Bronze
2005 Philippines	Kimberley Yap Fui Li (MAS)	Alessandra Araullo (PHI)	Ng Xinyi Alisa (SGP)
2007 Thailand	Kimbeley Yap Fui Li (MAS)	Alessandra Araullo (PHI)	Maria Melliza Gayle Lucas (PHI)
2015 Singapore	Maria Claire Adorna (PHI)	Kim Mangrobang (PHI)	Sarunthai Arunsiri (THA)
2017 Malaysia	Kim Mangrobang (PHI)	Maria Claire Adorna (PHI)	Irene Chong See Win (MAS)
2019 Philippines	Kim Mangrobang (PHI)	Kimberly Michelle Kligroe (PHI)	Nethavani Octaria (INA)
2021 Vietnam	Kim Mangrobang (PHI)	Inge Prasetyo (INA)	Raven Faith Alcoseba (PHI)
2023 Cambodia	Margot Garabedian (CAM)	Kim Mangrobang (PHI)	Louisa Marie Middleditch (SGP)
2025 Thailand	Martina Ayu Pratiwi (INA)	Kira Ellis (PHI)	Herlene Natasha Zhihui Yu (SGP)

==== Duathlon ====
Games	Gold	Silver	Bronze
2005 Philippines	Not Held		
2007 Thailand	Saifon Piawong (THA)	Sontiya Saiwaeo (THA)	Analiza Dysangco (PHI)
2015 Singapore	Not Held		
2017 Malaysia	Not Held		
2019 Philippines	Not Held		
2021 Vietnam	Kim Mangrobang (PHI)	Tahira Najmunisaa Muhammad Zaid (MAS)	Zahra Putri Bulan Aprillia (INA)
2023 Cambodia	Kim Mangrobang (PHI)	Nguyễn Thị Phương Trinh (VIE)	Maharani Azhri Wahyuningtyas (INA)

==== Aquathlon ====
Games	Gold	Silver	Bronze
2023 Cambodia	Margot Garabedian (CAM)	Aisika Kaewyongkod (THA)	Dea Salsabila Putri (INA)

=== Men's Team Relay ===
==== Triathlon ====
Games	Gold	Silver	Bronze
2025 Thailand	Philippines (PHI); Inaki Emil Lorbes; Fernando Jose Casares; Matthew Justine Hermosa	Singapore (SGP); Luke Li Rong Chua; Bryce Sheng Cher Chong; Yi Jun Tey	Indonesia (INA); Rashif Amila Yaqin; Al Kautsar; Aloysius Reckyardo Mardian

==== Duathlon ====
Games	Gold	Silver	Bronze
2025 Thailand	Vietnam (VIE); Nguyễn Anh Trí; Pao Sung; Phạm Tiến Sản	Indonesia (INA); Rashif Amila Yaqin; Ronald Bintang Setiawan; Alias Praji	Malaysia (MAS); Rikigoro Shinozuka; Martyn Lim Wen Xuan; Gavin Sim Wee Hon

==== Aquathlon ====
Games	Gold	Silver	Bronze
2025 Thailand	Indonesia (INA); Muhammad Noval Ashidiq; Muhammad Zidane; Rashif Amila Yaqin	Singapore (SGP); Luke Li Rong Chua; Bryce Sheng Cher Chong; Yi Jun Tey	Philippines (PHI); Inaki Emil Lorbes; Joshua Alexander Ramos; Andrew Kim Remolino

=== Women's Team Relay ===
==== Triathlon ====
Games	Gold	Silver	Bronze
2025 Thailand	Philippines (PHI); Erika Nicole Burgos; Raven Alcoseba; Kim Mangrobang	Indonesia (INA); Martina Ayu Pratiwi; Eva Desiana; Renata Berliana Aditya	Singapore (SGP); Yen Ling Kathlyn Yeo; Louisa Marie Middleditch; Herlene Natasha Zhihui Yu

==== Duathlon ====
Games	Gold	Silver	Bronze
2025 Thailand	Indonesia (INA); Martina Ayu Pratiwi; Eva Desiana; Zahra Bulan Aprillia Putri	Singapore (SGP); Rachel Hew Jia Yi; Ng Xuan Jie; Louisa Marie Middleditch	Vietnam (VIE); Nguyễn Thị Thúy Vân; Nguyễn Thị Phương Trinh; Lê Thị Bích

==== Aquathlon ====
Games	Gold	Silver	Bronze
2025 Thailand	Indonesia (INA); Martina Ayu Pratiwi; Kayla Nadia Shafa; Binta Erlen Salsabela	Philippines (PHI); Kira Ellis; Erika Nicole Burgos; Kim Mangrobang	Singapore (SGP); Wan Ting Lim; Louisa Marie Middleditch; Herlene Natasha Zhihui Yu

=== Mixed Team Relay ===
==== Triathlon ====
Games	Gold	Silver	Bronze
2019 Philippines	Philippines (PHI); John Leerams Chicano; Kim Mangrobang; Fernando Jose Casares; Maria Claire Adorna	Singapore (SGP); Luke Chua Li Rong; Herlene Natasha Yu Zhihui; Bryce Chong Sheng Cher; Emma Ada Middleditch	Indonesia (INA); Muhammad Ahlul Firman; Nethavani Octaria; Jauhari Johan; Eva Desiana
2021 Vietnam	Not Held		
2023 Cambodia	Not Held		
2025 Thailand	Philippines (PHI); Fernando Casares; Raven Alcoseba; Kira Ellis; Andrew Kim Remolino	Indonesia (INA); Martina Ayu Pratiwi; Hauqalah Fakhal Arvyello; Rashif Amila Yaqin; Binta Erlen Salsabela	Malaysia (MAS); Isaac Tan Zhen Wei; Yap Qi Yi; Esther Joy Chen Hong Li; Sara Joy Chen Hong Mae

==== Duathlon ====
Games	Gold	Silver	Bronze
2019 Philippines	Thailand (THA); Pareeya Sonsem; Nattawut Srinate; Siriwan Kuncharin; Arthit Soda	Singapore (SGP); Emma Ada Middleditch; Ahmad Arif Ibrahim; Herlene Natasha Yu; Nicholas Rachmadi	Philippines (PHI); Monica Torres; Efraim Iñigo; Mary Pauline Fornea; Emmanuel Comendador
2021 Vietnam	Not Held		
2023 Cambodia	Not Held		
2025 Thailand	Indonesia (INA); Alias Praji; Ronald Bintang Setiawan; Martina Ayu Pratiwi; Azizah Khusnul Qotimah	Philippines (PHI); Franklin Ferdie Yee; John Patrick Ciron; Merry Joy Trupa; Erika Nicole Burgos	Singapore (SGP); Arif Ibrahim Ahmad; Benjamin Khoo Jun Da; Rachel Hew Jia Yi; Louisa Marie Middleditch

==== Aquathlon ====
Games	Gold	Silver	Bronze
2023 Cambodia	Philippines (PHI); Matthew Hermosa; Kira Ellis; Erica Burgos; Inaki Lorbes	Indonesia (INA); Aloysius Reckyardo Mardian; Renata Berliana Aditya; Aryandra Fauzi Mauludin; Dea Salsabila Putri	Vietnam (VIE); Vũ Đình Duân; Nguyễn Hoàng Dung; Nguyễn Thị Kim Tuyến; Hoàng Văn Hải
2025 Thailand	Indonesia (INA); Muhammad Zidane; Rashif Amila Yaqin; Martina Ayu Pratiwi; Kayla Nadia Shafa	Philippines (PHI); Matthew Justine Hermosa; Andrew Kim Remolino; Kira Ellis; Raven Alcoseba	Malaysia (MAS); Wen May Ng; Sze Hui Teo; Ee Hann Kan; Nicholas Seh Kit Long

==== Medal summary ====
Rank	Nation	Gold	Silver	Bronze	Total
1	Philippines (PHI)	17	17	10	44
2	Indonesia (INA)	9	7	10	26
3	Vietnam (VIE)	3	1	2	6
4	Singapore (SGP)	2	5	9	16
5	Malaysia (MAS)	2	3	4	9
6	Thailand (THA)	2	3	2	7
7	Cambodia (CAM)	2	1	0	3
Totals (7 entries)		37	37	37	111

== See also ==
- Table tennis at the Asian Games
