= Gymnastics at the 2021 SEA Games – Men's parallel bars =

Southeast Asian Games

Gymnastics – Men's parallel bars at the 2021 SEA Games
- Venue: Quần Ngựa Sports Palace
- Date: 16 May 2022
- Competitors: 8 from 4 nations

Medalists
gold medal	Đinh Phương Thành (VIE)
silver medal	Carlos Yulo (PHI)
bronze medal	Lê Thanh Tùng (VIE)

The men's parallel bars competition for artistic gymnastics at the 2021 SEA Games in Vietnam was held from 16 May 2022 at Quần Ngựa Sports Palace.

== Schedule ==
All times are in Indochina Time (UTC+7).

Date	Time	Round
Friday, 13 May	10:00	Qualification
Monday, 16 May	14:00	Final

== Final ==
Rank	Name	Difficulty	Execution	Penalty	Total
1st place, gold medalist(s)	Đinh Phương Thành (VIE)	6.200	8.933		15.133
2nd place, silver medalist(s)	Carlos Yulo (PHI)				14.900
3rd place, bronze medalist(s)	Lê Thanh Tùng (VIE)				14.500
4	Jer Rong Chong (SGP)				12.400
5	Juancho Miguel Besana (PHI)				11.900
5	Luqman al Hafiz Zulfa (MAS)				11.600
7	Liew Jun Yi, Zac (SGP)				11.433
8	Ng Chun Chen (MAS)				10.767
