= Billiards and snooker at the 2021 SEA Games =

- Venue: Hà Đông District Sporting Hall
- Location: Hanoi, Vietnam
- Dates: 14–22 May 2022

Billiards and snooker competitions at the 2021 SEA Games took place at Hà Đông District Sporting Hall in Hanoi, Vietnam from 16 to 22 May 2022.

== Medal table ==
* Host nation (Vietnam)

Rank	Nation	Gold	Silver	Bronze	Total
1	Philippines	4	4	2	10
2	Vietnam*	2	2	4	8
3	Singapore	1	2	4	7
4	Malaysia	1	1	1	3
4	Myanmar	1	1	1	3
6	Thailand	1	0	8	9
Totals (6 entries)		10	10	20	40

== Medalists ==
=== Carom ===
Event	Gold	Silver	Bronze
Men's 1-cushion carom	Nguyễn Trần Thanh Tự; Vietnam	Phạm Quốc Tuấn; Vietnam	Francisco Dela Cruz; Philippines
Men's 1-cushion carom	Nguyễn Trần Thanh Tự; Vietnam	Phạm Quốc Tuấn; Vietnam	Efren Reyes; Philippines
Men's 3-cushion carom	Trấn Quyết Chiến; Vietnam	Nguyễn Đức Anh Chiến; Vietnam	Suriya Suwannasingh; Thailand
Men's 3-cushion carom	Trấn Quyết Chiến; Vietnam	Nguyễn Đức Anh Chiến; Vietnam	Sompol Saetang; Thailand

=== Pool ===
Event	Gold	Silver	Bronze
Men's 9-ball pool singles	Johann Chua; Philippines	Carlo Biado; Philippines	Aloysius Yapp; Singapore
Men's 9-ball pool singles	Johann Chua; Philippines	Carlo Biado; Philippines	Toh Lian Han; Singapore
Men's 10-ball pool singles	Carlo Biado; Philippines	Johann Chua; Philippines	Aloysius Yapp; Singapore
Men's 10-ball pool singles	Carlo Biado; Philippines	Johann Chua; Philippines	Toh Lian Han; Singapore
Women's 9-ball pool singles	Rubilen Amit; Philippines	Jessica Tan; Singapore	Bùi Xuân Vàng; Vietnam
Women's 9-ball pool singles	Rubilen Amit; Philippines	Jessica Tan; Singapore	Nguyễn Bích Trâm; Vietnam
Women's 10-ball pool singles	Rubilen Amit; Philippines	Chezka Centeno; Philippines	Pennipa Nakjui; Thailand
Women's 10-ball pool singles	Rubilen Amit; Philippines	Chezka Centeno; Philippines	Bùi Xuân Vàng; Vietnam

=== Snooker ===
Event	Gold	Silver	Bronze
Men's English billiard singles	Pauk Sa; Myanmar	Peter Gilchrist; Singapore	Praprut Chaithanasakun; Thailand
Men's English billiard singles	Pauk Sa; Myanmar	Peter Gilchrist; Singapore	Yuttapop Pakpoj; Thailand
Men's English billiard doubles	Singapore; Yi Wei Puan; Peter Gilchrist	Myanmar; Pauk Sa; Min Si Thu Tun	Thailand; Praprut Chaithanasakun; Thawat Sujaritthurakarn
Men's English billiard doubles	Singapore; Yi Wei Puan; Peter Gilchrist	Myanmar; Pauk Sa; Min Si Thu Tun	Vietnam; Nguyễn Thanh Bình; Trần Lê Anh Tuấn
Men's snooker singles	James Wattana; Thailand	Lim Kok Leong; Malaysia	Aung Phyo; Myanmar
Men's snooker singles	James Wattana; Thailand	Lim Kok Leong; Malaysia	Passakorn Suwannawat; Thailand
Men's snooker 6-red singles	Lim Kok Leong; Malaysia	Jeffrey Roda; Philippines	Moh Keen Hoo; Malaysia
Men's snooker 6-red singles	Lim Kok Leong; Malaysia	Jeffrey Roda; Philippines	Suchakree Poomjang; Thailand
