= Kurash at the 2021 SEA Games =

- Venue: Hoài Đức District Sporting Hall
- Location: Hanoi, Vietnam
- Date: 10–13 May 2022

The kurash competitions at the 2021 SEA Games took place at Hoài Đức District Sporting Hall in Hanoi, Vietnam from 10 to 13 May 2022.

== Medal table ==
* Host nation (Vietnam)

| Rank | Nation | Gold | Silver | Bronze | Total |
|---|---|---|---|---|---|
| 1 | Vietnam* | 7 | 5 | 5 | 17 |
| 2 | Philippines | 1 | 3 | 5 | 9 |
| 3 | Thailand | 1 | 1 | 5 | 7 |
| 4 | Myanmar | 1 | 1 | 2 | 4 |
| 5 | Malaysia | 0 | 0 | 3 | 3 |
| Totals (5 entries) | | 10 | 10 | 20 | 40 |

== Medalists ==
=== Men ===
| Event | Gold | Silver | Bronze |
|---|---|---|---|
| 60 kg | Lê Công Hoàng Hải; Vietnam | Phạm Võ Hoàng An; Vietnam | Al Rolan Llamas Sorne; Philippines |
| 60 kg | Lê Công Hoàng Hải; Vietnam | Phạm Võ Hoàng An; Vietnam | Seksan Arnkhian; Thailand |
| 66 kg | Lê Đức Đông; Vietnam | Phan Trúc Phi; Vietnam | Natchanon Saengkaew; Thailand |
| 66 kg | Lê Đức Đông; Vietnam | Phan Trúc Phi; Vietnam | Yousuff Daniel Fauzi Cruz; Malaysia |
| 73 kg | Jackielou Escarpe Agon; Philippines | Apicha Boonrangsee; Thailand | Mohamad Razlan Rohaidi; Malaysia |
| 73 kg | Jackielou Escarpe Agon; Philippines | Apicha Boonrangsee; Thailand | Soe Myint Tun; Myanmar |
| 81 kg | Bùi Minh Quân; Vietnam | Trần Thanh Hiển; Vietnam | Nopphasit Lertsirisombut; Thailand |
| 81 kg | Bùi Minh Quân; Vietnam | Trần Thanh Hiển; Vietnam | Renzo Miguel Cazeñas Castro; Philippines |
| 90 kg | Trần Thương; Vietnam | Lê Duy Thành; Vietnam | George Angelo Baclagan; Philippines |
| 90 kg | Trần Thương; Vietnam | Lê Duy Thành; Vietnam | Mohamed Ezzat Mohamed Noor; Malaysia |

=== Women ===
| Event | Gold | Silver | Bronze |
|---|---|---|---|
| 48 kg | Tô Thị Trang; Vietnam | Helen Aclopen Talongen; Philippines | Khin Khin Su; Myanmar |
| 48 kg | Tô Thị Trang; Vietnam | Helen Aclopen Talongen; Philippines | Duangdara Kumlert; Thailand |
| 52 kg | Phạm Nguyễn Hồng Mơ; Vietnam | Charmea Quelino Kingay; Philippines | Nguyễn Thị Tuyết Hân; Vietnam |
| 52 kg | Phạm Nguyễn Hồng Mơ; Vietnam | Charmea Quelino Kingay; Philippines | Noelle Roseline Grandjean; Thailand |
| 57 kg | Saowalak Homklin; Thailand | Đồng Thị Thu Hiền; Vietnam | Estie Gay Liwanen; Philippines |
| 57 kg | Saowalak Homklin; Thailand | Đồng Thị Thu Hiền; Vietnam | Nguyễn Thị Ngọc Nhung; Vietnam |
| 70 kg | Nguyễn Thị Thanh Trâm; Vietnam | Phyo Swe Zin Kyaw; Myanmar | Bianca Estrella Tialco; Philippines |
| 70 kg | Nguyễn Thị Thanh Trâm; Vietnam | Phyo Swe Zin Kyaw; Myanmar | Nguyễn Thị Lan; Vietnam |
| 87 kg | Aye Aye Aung; Myanmar | Sydney Sy Tancontian; Philippines | Trần Thị Thanh Thủy; Vietnam |
| 87 kg | Aye Aye Aung; Myanmar | Sydney Sy Tancontian; Philippines | Hoàng Bùi Thúy Linh; Vietnam |
