= Wrestling at the 2021 SEA Games =

- Venue: Gia Lâm District Sporting Hall
- Location: Hanoi, Vietnam
- Dates: 17–19 May 2022

Wrestling competitions at the 2021 SEA Games took place at Gia Lâm District Sporting Hall in Hanoi, Vietnam from 17 to 19 May 2022.

== Medal table ==
* Host nation (Vietnam)

Rank	Nation	Gold	Silver	Bronze	Total
1	Vietnam*	17	1	0	18
2	Cambodia	1	1	4	6
3	Philippines	0	7	5	12
4	Thailand	0	6	4	10
5	Indonesia	0	2	1	3
6	Singapore	0	1	1	2
7	Laos	0	0	2	2
Totals (7 entries)		18	18	17	53

== Medalists ==
=== Men's Greco-Roman ===
Event	Gold	Silver	Bronze
60 kg	Bùi Tiến Hải; Vietnam	Kritsada Kongsrichai; Thailand	Margarito Angana Jr. Philippines
67 kg	Bùi Mạnh Hùng; Vietnam	Muhammad Aliansyah; Indonesia	Noel Norada; Philippines
77 kg	Nguyễn Bá Sơn; Vietnam	Wisit Thamwirat; Thailand	Andika Sulaeman; Indonesia
87 kg	Nghiêm Đình Hiếu; Vietnam	Jefferson Manatad; Philippines	Chiranuwat Chamnanjan; Thailand
97 kg	Nguyễn Minh Hiếu; Vietnam	Anucha Yospanya; Thailand	Jason Balabal; Philippines
130 kg	Hà Văn Hiếu; Vietnam	Nanthawat Panphuek; Thailand	Timothy Loh; Singapore

=== Men's freestyle ===
Event	Gold	Silver	Bronze
57 kg	Phùng Khắc Huy; Vietnam	Alvin Lobreguito; Philippines	Soeun Sophors; Cambodia
65 kg	Nguyễn Xuân Định; Vietnam	Jhonny Morte; Philippines	Siripong Jumpakam; Thailand
74 kg	Cấn Tất Dự; Vietnam	Ronil Tubog; Philippines	Parinya Chamnanjan; Thailand
86 kg	Trần Văn Trường Vũ; Vietnam	Gary Chow; Singapore	Heng Vuthy; Cambodia
97 kg	Hoàng Văn Nam; Vietnam	Mo Sari; Cambodia	Jason Balabal; Philippines
125 kg	Sou Bali; Cambodia	Ngô Văn Lâm; Vietnam	Phonexay Phachanxay; Laos

=== Women's freestyle ===
Event	Gold	Silver	Bronze
50 kg	Nguyễn Thị Xuân; Vietnam	Jiah Pingot; Philippines	Dit Samnang; Cambodia
53 kg	Kiều Thị Ly; Vietnam	Nattakarn Kaewkhuanchum; Thailand	Grace Loberanes; Philippines
57 kg	Nguyễn Thị Mỹ Trang; Vietnam	Minalyn Foy-os Langngag; Philippines	Sriprapa Tho-Kaew; Thailand
62 kg	Nguyễn Thị Mỹ Hạnh; Vietnam	Kharisma Tantri Herlina; Indonesia	Chea Kanha; Cambodia
68 kg	Lại Diệu Thương; Vietnam	Salinee Srisombat; Thailand	—N/a
76 kg	Đặng Thị Linh; Vietnam	Noemi Tenner; Philippines	Latxomphou Oday; Laos
