= Myanmar at the 2021 SEA Games =

Myanmar at the 2021 Southeast Asian Games
- IOC code: MYA
- NOC: Myanmar Olympic Committee

in the Vietnam
- Competitors: 352 in 20 sports
- Flag bearer: Aung Tun Min
- Medals Ranked 7th: Gold 9 Silver 18 Bronze 35 Total 62

Southeast Asian Games appearances (overview)
- 1959; 1961; 1965; 1967; 1969; 1971; 1973; 1975; 1977; 1979; 1981; 1983; 1985; 1987; 1989; 1991; 1993; 1995; 1997; 1999; 2001; 2003; 2005; 2007; 2009; 2011; 2013; 2015; 2017; 2019; 2021; 2023; 2025; 2027; 2029

Myanmar participated at the 2021 SEA Games in Hanoi, Vietnam from 12 May 2022 to 23 May 2022. Originally scheduled to take place in 2021, the Games were postponed due to the COVID-19 pandemic. The Myanmar Olympic Committee sent a Myanmar sports team to compete in 20 sports.

Following the coup d'état on 1 February 2021, a change of leadership took place in the Myanmar Olympic Committee. The sports sector from former Ministry of Health and Sports was reorganized into the Ministry of Sports and Youth Affairs. During the 2020 Summer Olympics, some athletes have refused to represent Myanmar. Some athletes also did not compete in the Vietnam SEA Games. Myanmar athletes started training for the Vietnam SEA Games in April 2021.

== Medal summary ==
=== Medal by sport ===
Medals by sport
Sport	1st place, gold medalist(s)	2nd place, silver medalist(s)	3rd place, bronze medalist(s)	Total	Rank
Vovinam	3	3	6	12	2
Wushu	1	2	2	5	6
Bodybuilding	1	2	1	4	4
Kurash	1	1	2	4	4
Billiards and snooker	1	1	1	3	4
Sepak takraw	1	0	3	4	3
Pétanque	1	0	2	3	4
Judo	0	2	2	4	5
Athletics	0	2	0	2	7
Shooting	0	2	0	2	6
Canoeing	0	1	6	7	5
Taekwondo	0	1	3	4	7
Boxing	0	1	2	3	6
Rowing	0	0	3	3	5
Archery	0	0	1	1	7
Total	9	18	35	62	7

== Medalists ==
=== Gold ===
Medal	Name	Sport	Event	Date
(gold) Gold	Aye Aye Aung	Kurash	Women's +87kg	11 May
(gold) Gold	Khin Cherry Thet	Pétanque	Women's shooting	13 May
(gold) Gold	Ye Tun Naung	Bodybuilding	Lightweight - up to and incl. 70kg	14 May
(gold) Gold	Thein Than Oo	Wushu	Men's taolu nangun	15 May
(gold) Gold	Pauk Sa	Billiards	Men's English billiards singles	17 May
(gold) Gold	Khaing War Phoo; May Honey Aung Lwin	Vovinam	Female couple hand practice: dual form	18 May
(gold) Gold	Phyu Phyu Than; Khin Hnin Wai	Sepak takraw	Women's doubles	19 May
(gold) Gold	Zaw Zaw; Aik Soe Linn; Zin Lin Htun; Mana Kui	Vovinam	Male multiple weapon practice: 01 player defends against 03 others with weapon	20 May
(gold) Gold	Hein Htet Aung; Kyaw Thu Soe Aung; Aung Khaing Linn; Yar Zar Tun	Vovinam	Male leg - attack technique: 04 males, each performs 2 legs attack techniques	22 May

=== Silver ===
Medal	Name	Sport	Event	Date
(silver) Silver	Phyo Swe Zin Kyaw	Kurash	Women's 70kg	13 May
(silver) Silver	Sandy Oo	Wushu	Women's taolu Qiangshu	14 May
(silver) Silver	Min Zaw Oo	Bodybuilding	Lightmiddleweight - up to and incl.80kg	14 May
(silver) Silver	Khin Mg Kyaw	Bodybuilding	Bodybuilding – middleweight - up to and incl. 85kg	14 May
(silver) Silver	Su Hlaing Win	Wushu	Women's sanda 60kg	15 May
(silver) Silver	Ye Tun Naung	Shooting	Men's 50m pistol	17 May
(silver) Silver	Tun Min Thant; Saw Moe Aung; Htet Wai Lwin; Myint Ko Ko	Canoeing	Men's kayak four, 1000 meters	18 May
(silver) Silver	Zin May Htet	Athletics	Women's 20km Walk	19 May
(silver) Silver	Dhaysi Oo Julius	Taekwondo	Kyorugi for female under 49kg	19 May
(silver) Silver	Nwe Ni Pwint Hlaing	Judo	Women's - 63kg	19 May
(silver) Silver	Khine War Phoo	Vovinam	Female single hand practice: dragon tiger form	20 May
(silver) Silver	May Haan Ni Aung Lwin	Vovinam	Female single weapon practice: ying-yang sword form	20 May
(silver) Silver	Pauk Sa; Min Si Tu Thun	Billiards	Men's English billiards double	20 May
(silver) Silver	Chit Soe Nwe; Ye Tun Naung	Shooting	Mixed team air pistol	21 May
(silver) Silver	Tin Htoo Zaw	Vovinam	Male single weapon practice: four-element staff form	21 May
(silver) Silver	Naing Latt	Boxing	Men's 52kg - 57kg	22 May

=== Bronze ===
Medal	Name	Sport	Event	Date
(bronze) Bronze	Khin Khin Su	Kurash	Women's - 48kg	10 May
(bronze) Bronze	Shwe Zin Latt; Nilar Win	Rowing	Women's pair	13 May
(bronze) Bronze	Win Thurain Tun	Pétanque	Men's shooting	13 May
(bronze) Bronze	Kyaw Min Than	Bodybuilding	Light flyweight - up to and incl. 55 kg	13 May
(bronze) Bronze	Soe Myint Tun	Kurash	Men's - 73kg	13 May
(bronze) Bronze	Shwe Zin Latt; Nilar Win	Rowing	Women's double sculls	14 May
(bronze) Bronze	Ei Phyu; Sandar Shwe; Chit Poo Ngon; Win Thuzar Thein	Rowing	Women's lightweight coxless four	14 May
(bronze) Bronze	Myo Min Htet	Wushu	Men's sanda 70kg	14 May
(bronze) Bronze	Cherry Than	Wushu	Women's sanda 52kg	14 May
(bronze) Bronze	Thet Phyo Naing	Canoeing	Women's canoe single, 1000 meters	17 May
(bronze) Bronze	Gant Gaw Thant Zin; Tin Tin Wai; Ko Ko Htwe	Pétanque	Triples 2 women 1 man	17 May
(bronze) Bronze	Ya Mint Thu; Pyae Sone Hnin; Thidar Nwe	Archery	Women's team recurve	18 May
(bronze) Bronze	Mint Naing; Thant Zin Oo; Sai Min Wai; Win Htike	Canoeing	Men's canoe four, 1000 meters	18 May
(bronze) Bronze		Vovinam	Women's - 55kg	18 May
(bronze) Bronze	Zaw Lin Htet	Taekwondo	Kyorugi for male under 63kg	18 May
(bronze) Bronze	Htet Wai Lwin; Kyaw Zin Latt	Canoeing	Men's kayak double, 1000 meters	19 May
(bronze) Bronze	Wai Lin Aung; Kyaw Zin Latt	Sepak takraw	Men's doubles	19 May
(bronze) Bronze	Zin Mar Khaing	Vovinam	Women's 65kg	19 May
(bronze) Bronze	Kyaw Min Naing	Taekwondo	Kyorugi for male under 87kg	19 May
(bronze) Bronze	Htet Zaw Lin	Taekwondo	Kyorugi for male under 80kg	19 May
(bronze) Bronze	Lin Htut Paing	Boxing	Men's 48kg - 52kg	19 May
(bronze) Bronze	Aye Hyein Htoo	Boxing	Women's 45kg - 48kg	19 May
(bronze) Bronze	Myo Hlaing Win; Min Naing; Thant Zin Oo; Win Htike	Canoeing	Men's canoe four, 500 meters	20 May
(bronze) Bronze	Wai Thu Lwin	Vovinam	Men's 65kg	20 May
(bronze) Bronze	Naw Ta Boe Yar	Weightlifting	Women’s 59kg	20 May
(bronze) Bronze	Aye Mar Lar	Judo	Women's - 52kg	20 May
(bronze) Bronze	Thet Phyo Naing	Canoeing	Women's canoe single, 200 meters	21 May
(bronze) Bronze	Moe Ma Ma; Myint Myint Soe; Su Wai Phyo; Thet Phyo Naing	Canoeing	Women's canoe four, 200 meters	21 May
(bronze) Bronze	Wai Lin Aung; Thant Zin Oo; Aung Thu Min; Kyaw Zin Latt	Sepak takraw	Men's quard	21 May
(bronze) Bronze	Kyaw Ko Ko	Vovinam	Men's - 55kg	21 May
(bronze) Bronze	Yar Zar Tun; Tin Htoo Zaw	Vovinam	Male couple weapon practice: pair machete form	21 May
(bronze) Bronze	Aung Phyo	Billiards	Men's snooker singles	21 May
(bronze) Bronze	Ya Mong Zin; Nant Yin Yin Myint; Phyu Phyu Than; Khin Hnin Wai	Sepak takraw	Women's quard	21 May
(bronze) Bronze	Sel Wee	Judo	Women's - 45kg	21 May
(bronze) Bronze	Shwe Thet Htar	Vovinam	Women's 60kg	22 May

== Billiards ==
The Myanmar team competed in Billiards with four pool competitions and two carom competitions.

== Bodybuilding ==
Eleven athletes competed in bodybuilding competitions.

== Football ==
=== Men's tournament ===
==== Group stage ====
8 May 2022
16:00

Timor-Leste	2–3	Myanmar
Mouzinho 52'; Soares 64'	Report	Win Naing Tun 37'; Htet Phyo Wai 41'; Aung Wunna Soe 90+5'

Việt Trì Stadium, Phú Thọ
Attendance: 3,568
Referee: Mohammad Issa (Lebanon)
10 May 2022
16:00

Myanmar	3–2	Philippines
Win Naing Tun 2'; Lwin Moe Aung 51'; Soe Moe Kyaw 53'	Report	Bedic 34', 38' (pen.)

Việt Trì Stadium, Phú Thọ
Attendance: 4,418
Referee: Mohammad Arafah (Jordan)
13 May 2022
19:00

Myanmar	0–1	Vietnam
		Đỗ Hùng Dũng 76'

Việt Trì Stadium, Phú Thọ
15 May 2022
16:00

Indonesia	3–1	Myanmar
Egy 6'; Witan 10'; Marselino 45+2'	Report	Win Naing Tun 67'

Việt Trì Stadium, Phú Thọ
Attendance: 2,519
Referee: Mohammad Arafah (Jordan)

== Judo ==
The Myanmar team competed in judo.

== Sepak takraw ==
The Myanmar team competed in sepak takraw.

== Shooting ==
The Myanmar team competed in shooting.
