= Bowling at the 2021 SEA Games =

- Venue: Royal City Hanoi
- Location: Hanoi, Vietnam
- Dates: 16–19 May 2022

Bowling competitions at the 2021 SEA Games took place at Royal City Hanoi in Hanoi, Vietnam from 16 to 19 May 2022.

== Medal table ==
* Host nation (Vietnam)

Rank	Nation	Gold	Silver	Bronze	Total
1	Singapore	3	1	3	7
2	Philippines	2	1	0	3
3	Indonesia	1	1	2	4
4	Malaysia	0	2	1	3
5	Thailand	0	1	0	1
Totals (5 entries)		6	6	6	18

== Medalists ==
=== Men ===
Event	Gold	Silver	Bronze
Singles	Merwin Matheiu Tan; Philippines	Yannaphon Larpapharat; Thailand	Ryan Leonard Lalisang; Indonesia
Doubles	Indonesia; Hardy Rachmadian; Ryan Leonard Lalisang	Singapore; Muhd Jaris Goh; Timothy Tham	Singapore; Cheah Ray Han; Darren Ong
Team of four	Philippines; Christian Dychangco; Ivan Dominic Malig; Patrick Neil Nuqui; Merwin Matheiu Tan	Malaysia; Shahrukh Amin Zulkifli; Nevern Netaneel Marcellinus; Muhammad Hafiz Zainuddin; Muhammad Syarizol Shamsudin	Singapore; Cheah Ray Han; Darren Ong; Muhd Jaris Goh; Timothy Tham

=== Women ===
Event	Gold	Silver	Bronze
Singles	Cherie Tan; Singapore	Marie Alexis Sy; Philippines	New Hui Fen; Singapore
Doubles	Singapore; Cherie Tan; New Hui Fen	Indonesia; Sharon Limansantoso; Tannya Roumimper	Malaysia; Nur Syazwani Sahar; Gillian Lim
Team of four	Singapore; Cherie Tan; New Hui Fen; Daphne Tan; Bernice Lim	Malaysia; Nur Syazwani Sahar; Gillian Lim Siew Giok; Nerosha Keligit Thiagarajan; Nora Lyana Nastasia	Indonesia; Putty Armein; Sharon Limansantoso; Shinta Ceysaria Yunita; Tannya Roumimper
