= Ronil Tubog =

Filipino freestyle wrestler

Personal information
- National team: Philippines
- Born: January 29, 1993 (age 33)
- Home town: Cebu

Sport
- Sport: Freestyle wrestling
Medal record
Men's wrestling
Representing Philippines
SEA Games
Gold medal – first place	2023 Cambodia	Freestyle -61kg
Silver medal – second place	2025 Thailand	Freestyle -65kg
Silver medal – second place	2021 Vietnam	Freestyle -74kg
Silver medal – second place	2019 Philippines	Freestyle -61kg
Southeast Asian Championships
Gold medal – first place	2015 Vietnam	Freestyle -61kg
Silver medal – second place	2022 Cambodia	Freestyle -61kg
Silver medal – second place	2018 Philippines	Freestyle -61kg
Bronze medal – third place	2017 Vietnam	Freestyle -61kg

Ronil Tubog (born January 29, 1993) is a Filipino freestyle wrestler.

== Personal life ==
Ronil Tubog was born on January 29, 1993. He hails from Cebu, Philippines.

== Career ==
Tubog has been a frequent competitor in the SEA Games. He took part at the 30th edition hosted in the Philippines, where he clinched a silver medal in a 61kg freestyle wrestling competition. At the 31st Southeast Asian Games held in Vietnam, Tubog was lost to Vietnam’s Tat Du Can, 0-2. He finished with a silver medal in the final of the men’s 74 kg freestyle. On the 32nd edition of the Southeast Asian Games held in Cambodia, Tubog finally claimed SEA Games gold medal on Tuesday after ruling the men’s freestyle -61 kg event held at the Chroy Changvar Convention Center. In the 33rd SEA Games held in Thailand, Tubog clinched a silver medal in a 65 kg freestyle wrestling competition.
