= Dancesport at the 2021 SEA Games =

Event held in Southeast Asia

- Venue: Long Biên District Sporting Hall
- Location: Hanoi, Vietnam
- Dates: 15–16 May 2022

Dancesport competitions at the 2021 SEA Games took place at Long Biên District Sporting Hall in Hanoi, Vietnam from 15 to 16 May 2022.

== Medal table ==
* Host nation (Vietnam)

Rank	Nation	Gold	Silver	Bronze	Total
1	Philippines	5	5	2	12
2	Vietnam*	5	1	5	11
3	Thailand	2	6	4	12
4	Malaysia	0	0	1	1
Totals (4 entries)		12	12	12	36

== Medalists ==
=== Standard ===
Event	Gold	Silver	Bronze
Quickstep	Thailand; Issarapong Duangkaew; Thanawan Yananun Score: 32.800	Philippines; Mark Jayson Gayon; Mary Joy Renigen Score: 32.750	Vietnam; Vũ Hoàng Anh Minh; Nguyễn Trường Xuân Score: 32.050
Slow Foxtrot	Philippines; Mark Jayson Gayon; Mary Joy Renigen Score: 33.100	Thailand; Anucha Wijitkoon; Pasrapon Phandech Score: 32.250	Malaysia; Leonard Hoh Jie Ren; Mu Ning Huan Score: 31.050
Tango	Philippines; Sean Mischa Aranar; Ana Leonila Nualla Score: 33.750	Thailand; Issarapong Duangkaew; Thanawan Yananun Score: 32.950	Vietnam; Nguyễn Đức Hòa; Nguyễn Thị Hải Yến Score: 32.200
Viennese Waltz	Philippines; Sean Mischa Aranar; Ana Leonila Nualla Score: 33.100	Thailand; Anucha Wijitkoon; Pasrapon Phandech Score: 32.500	Vietnam; Vũ Hoàng Anh Minh; Nguyễn Trường Xuân Score: 31.450
Waltz	Thailand; Issarapong Duangkaew; Thanawan Yananun Score: 33.450	Philippines; Mark Jayson Gayon; Mary Joy Renigen Score: 33.000	Vietnam; Nguyễn Đức Hòa; Nguyễn Thị Hải Yến Score: 31.950
Five dances	Philippines; Sean Mischa Aranar; Ana Leonila Nualla	Thailand; Anucha Wijitkoon; Pasrapon Phandech	Vietnam; Nguyễn Đức Hòa; Nguyễn Thị Hải Yến

=== Latin American ===
Event	Gold	Silver	Bronze
Cha Cha Cha	Philippines; Michael Angelo Marquez; Stephanie Sabalo Score: 33.200	Vietnam; Phạm Hồng Anh; Nguyễn Trung Kiên Score: 32.550	Thailand; Shinawat Lerson; Preeyanoot Patoomsriwiroje Score: 31.900
Jive	Vietnam; Nguyễn Đoàn Minh Trường; Đặng Thu Hương Score: 33.900	Philippines; Michael Angelo Marquez; Stephanie Sabalo Score: 32.700	Thailand; Jettapon Inthakun; Apichaya Kuptawanith Score: 31.800
Paso Doble	Vietnam; Nguyễn Đoàn Minh Trường; Đặng Thu Hương Score: 33.600	Thailand; Shinawat Lerson; Preeyanoot Patoomsriwiroje Score: 32.150	Philippines; Wilbert Aunzo; Pearl Marie Cañeda Score: 31.300
Rumba	Vietnam; Phạm Hồng Anh; Nguyễn Trung Kiên Score: 33.550	Thailand; Jettapon Inthakun; Apichaya Kuptawanith Score: 32.700	Philippines; Wilbert Aunzo; Pearl Marie Cañeda Score: 31.900
Samba	Vietnam; Phạm Hồng Anh; Nguyễn Trung Kiên Score: 33.388	Philippines; Wilbert Aunzo; Pearl Marie Cañeda Score: 31.800	Thailand; Jettapon Inthakun; Apichaya Kuptawanith Score: 31.600
Five dances	Vietnam; Nguyễn Đoàn Minh Trường; Đặng Thu Hương	Philippines; Michael Angelo Marquez; Stephanie Sabalo	Thailand; Shinawat Lerson; Preeyanoot Patoomsriwiroje
