= Boxing at the 2021 SEA Games =

Boxing competitions

- Venue: Bắc Ninh Gymnasium
- Location: Bắc Ninh, Vietnam
- Dates: 16–22 May 2022

Boxing competitions at the 2021 SEA Games took place at Bắc Ninh Gymnasium in Bắc Ninh, Vietnam from 16 to 22 May 2022.

== Medal table ==
* Host nation (Vietnam)

Rank	Nation	Gold	Silver	Bronze	Total
1	Thailand	4	2	3	9
2	Vietnam*	3	2	2	7
3	Philippines	3	1	5	9
4	Indonesia	1	3	1	5
5	Cambodia	0	1	3	4
6	Myanmar	0	1	2	3
7	Timor-Leste	0	1	1	2
8	Malaysia	0	0	3	3
9	Laos	0	0	1	1
9	Singapore	0	0	1	1
Totals (10 entries)		11	11	22	44

== Medalists ==
=== Men ===
Event	Gold	Silver	Bronze
Flyweight (48-52 kg)	Rogen Ladon; Philippines	Trần Văn Thảo; Vietnam	Linn Htut Paing; Myanmar
Flyweight (48-52 kg)	Rogen Ladon; Philippines	Trần Văn Thảo; Vietnam	Thanarat Saengphet; Thailand
Bantamweight (57 kg)	Ian Clark Bautista; Philippines	Naing Latt; Myanmar	Sao Rangsey; Cambodia
Bantamweight (57 kg)	Ian Clark Bautista; Philippines	Naing Latt; Myanmar	Jose Quintas Da Silva Barreto; Timor-Leste
Lightweight (63 kg)	Somchay Wongsuwan; Thailand	Farrand Papendang; Indonesia	Mohamad Akram; Malaysia
Lightweight (63 kg)	Somchay Wongsuwan; Thailand	Farrand Papendang; Indonesia	James Palicte; Philippines
Welterweight (69 kg)	Bunjong Sinsiri; Thailand	Sarohatua Lumbantobing; Indonesia	Mohd Aswan; Malaysia
Welterweight (69 kg)	Bunjong Sinsiri; Thailand	Sarohatua Lumbantobing; Indonesia	Marjon Piañar; Philippines
Middleweight (75 kg)	Eumir Felix Marcial; Philippines	Delio Anzaqeci Mouzinho; Timor-Leste	Peerapat Yeasungnoen; Thailand
Middleweight (75 kg)	Eumir Felix Marcial; Philippines	Delio Anzaqeci Mouzinho; Timor-Leste	Hun Kimheang; Cambodia
Light heavyweight (81 kg)	Michael Roberrd Muskita; Indonesia	Anavat Thongkrathok; Thailand	Trương Đình Hoàng; Vietnam
Light heavyweight (81 kg)	Michael Roberrd Muskita; Indonesia	Anavat Thongkrathok; Thailand	Khir Akyazlan Azmi; Malaysia
Heavyweight (91 kg)	Jakkapong Yomkhot; Thailand	Phearak Ong; Cambodia	Nguyễn Mạnh Cường; Vietnam
Heavyweight (91 kg)	Jakkapong Yomkhot; Thailand	Phearak Ong; Cambodia	Muhammad Dinie Hakeem; Singapore

=== Women ===
Event	Gold	Silver	Bronze
Light flyweight (45–48 kg)	Chuthamat Raksat; Thailand	Trịnh Thị Diễm Kiều; Vietnam	Josie Gabuco; Philippines
Light flyweight (45–48 kg)	Chuthamat Raksat; Thailand	Trịnh Thị Diễm Kiều; Vietnam	Aye Nyein Htoo; Myanmar
Flyweight (51 kg)	Nguyễn Thị Tâm; Vietnam	Irish Magno; Philippines	Nillada Meekoon; Thailand
Flyweight (51 kg)	Nguyễn Thị Tâm; Vietnam	Irish Magno; Philippines	Novita Sinadia; Indonesia
Featherweight (57 kg)	Vương Thị Vỹ; Vietnam	Nilawan Techasuep; Thailand	Riza Pasuit; Philippines
Featherweight (57 kg)	Vương Thị Vỹ; Vietnam	Nilawan Techasuep; Thailand	Vy Sreysros; Cambodia
Lightweight (60 kg)	Trần Thị Linh; Vietnam	Huswatun Hasanah; Indonesia	Nesthy Petecio; Philippines
Lightweight (60 kg)	Trần Thị Linh; Vietnam	Huswatun Hasanah; Indonesia	Douangchay Thalengliep; Laos

== Results ==
=== Men's Flyweight (48-52 kg) ===
Quarterfinals		Semifinals		Finals
Trần Văn Thảo (VIE)	5
Kornelis Kwangu Langu (INA)	0	Trần Văn Thảo (VIE)	5
Linn Htut Paing (MYA)	5	Linn Htut Paing (MYA)	0
Nov Sotky (CAM)	0			Trần Văn Thảo (VIE)	2
Thanarat Saengphet (THA)	5			Rogen Ladon (PHI)	3
Nov Sokty (CAM)	0	Thanarat Saengphet (THA)	2
Muhammad Abdul Qalyum (MAS)	0	Rogen Ladon (PHI)	3
Rogen Ladon (PHI)	5

=== Men's Bantamweight (57 kg) ===
Quarterfinals
Mohamed Hanurdeen (SGP)	0
Ian Clark Bautista (PHI)	5
Sheikh Rahmatullah (MAS)	0
Sao Rangsey (CAM)	5

Semifinals
Ian Clark Bautista (PHI)	5
Sao Rangsey (CAM)	0
Naing Latt (MYA)	3
Jose Quintas Da Silva Barreto (TLS)	2

Finals
Ian Clark Bautista (PHI)	5
Naing Latt (MYA)	0

=== Men's Lightweight (63 kg) ===
Preliminaries
Vũ Thành Đạt (VIE)	1
James Palicte (PHI)	4

Quarterfinals
James Palicte (PHI)	KO
Touch Davit (CAM)
Ye Naing (MYA)	0
Farrand Papendang (INA)	5
Elisio Raimundo Gaio (TLS)	0
Somchay Wongsuwan (THA)	5
Mohamad Akram (MAS)	5
Walter Sarnoi Oupathana (LAO)	0

Semifinals
James Palicte (PHI)	0
Farrand Papendang (INA)	3
Somchay Wongsuwan (THA)	3
Mohamad Akram (MAS)	2

Finals
Farrand Papendang (INA)	0
' Somchay Wongsuwan (THA)	5

=== Men's Welterweight (69 kg) ===
Quarterfinals
Trần Đức Thọ (VIE)	0
Bunjong Sinsiri (THA)	5
Bualy Chanthasenh (MYA)
Mohd Aswan (MAS)	DEF
Sarohatua Lumbantobing (INA)	5
Vy Sophors (CAM)	0

Semifinals
Bunjong Sinsiri (THA)	5
Mohd Aswan (MAS)	0
Sarohatua Lumbantobing (INA)	4
Marjon Piañar (PHI)	1

Finals
Bunjong Sinsiri (THA)	5
Sarohatua Lumbantobing (INA)	0

=== Men's Middleweight (75 kg) ===
Quarterfinals
Bùi Phước Tùng (VIE)	1
Peerapat Yeasungnoen (THA)	5
Muhamad Firdaus (MAS)	0
Delio Anzaqeci Mouzinho (TLS)	5
Hun Kimheang (CAM)	KO
Ye Win Naing (MYA)

Semifinals
Eumir Marcial (PHI)	RSC
Peerapat Yeasungnoen (THA)
Delio Anzaqeci Mouzinho (TLS)	KO
Hun Kimheang (CAM)

Finals
Eumir Marcial (PHI)	5
Delio Anzaqeci Mouzinho (TLS)	0

=== Men's Light Heavyweight (81 kg) ===
Quarterfinals
Maikhel Roberrd Muskita (INA)	5
Aung Pyae Phyo (MYA)	0

Semifinals
Maikhel Roberrd Muskita (INA)	5
Trương Đình Hoàng (VIE)	0
Anavat Thongkrathok (THA)	5
Khir Akyazlan Azmi (MAS)	0

Finals
Maikhel Roberrd Muskita (INA)	5
Anavat Thongkrathok (THA)	0

=== Men's Heavyweight (91 kg) ===
Semifinals		Finals
Nguyễn Mạnh Cường (VIE)	0
Jakkapong Yomkhot (THA)	5	Jakkapong Yomkhot (THA)	5
Muhammad Dinie Hakeem (SGP)	0	Phearak Ong (CAM)	0
Phearak Ong (CAM)	5

=== Women's Light Flyweight (45-48 kg) ===
Semifinals		Finals
Trịnh Thị Diễm (VIE)	3
Aye Nyein Htoo (MYA)	2	Trịnh Thị Diễm (VIE)	0
Josie Gabuco (PHI)	1	Chuthamat Raksat (THA)	5
Chuthamat Raksat (THA)	4

=== Women's Flyweight (51 kg) ===
Quarterfinals
Nguyễn Thị Tâm (VIE)	KO
Soeun Sokly (CAM)
Nillada Meekoon (THA)	5
Su Shar Nyo (MYA)	0

Semifinals
Nguyễn Thị Tâm (VIE)	5
Nillada Meekoon (THA)	0
Irish Magno (PHI)	5
Novita Sinadia (INA)	0

Finals
Nguyễn Thị Tâm (VIE)	3
Irish Magno (PHI)	2

=== Women's Featherweight (57 kg) ===
Quarterfinals		Semifinals		Finals
		Vy Sreysros (CAM)
Nilawan Techasuep (THA)	5	Nilawan Techasuep (THA)	RSC
Vilayphone Vongphachan (LAO)	0			Nilawan Techasuep (THA)	2
				Vương Thị Vỹ (VIE)	3
		Vương Thị Vỹ (VIE)	5
		Riza Pasuit (PHI)	0

=== Women's Lightweight (60 kg) ===
Quarterfinals
Trần Thị Linh (VIE)	5
Sudaporn Seeondee (THA)	0
Nesthy Petecio (PHI)	5
Kay Thwe Nyein (MYA)	0

Semifinals
Trần Thị Linh (VIE)	3
Nesthy Petecio (PHI)	2
Huswatun Hasanah (INA)	5
Douangchay Thalengliep (LAO)	0

Finals
Trần Thị Linh (VIE)	5
Huswatun Hasanah (INA)	0
