= Judo at the 2021 SEA Games =

- Venue: Hoài Đức District Sporting Hall
- Location: Hanoi, Vietnam
- Dates: 18–22 May 2022

Judo competitions at the 2021 SEA Games took place at Hoài Đức District Sporting Hall in Hanoi, Vietnam from 18 to 22 May 2022.

== Medal table ==
* Host nation (Vietnam)

Rank	Nation	Gold	Silver	Bronze	Total
1	Vietnam*	9	2	4	15
2	Philippines	2	4	4	10
3	Thailand	1	2	6	9
4	Indonesia	1	1	4	6
5	Laos	0	2	2	4
5	Myanmar	0	2	2	4
7	Malaysia	0	0	2	2
8	Cambodia	0	0	1	1
8	Singapore	0	0	1	1
Totals (9 entries)		13	13	26	52

== Medalists ==
=== Kata ===
Event	Gold	Silver	Bronze
Men's kodokan goshin jutsu	Vietnam; Phan Minh Hạnh; Trần Quốc Cường	Vietnam; Hà Minh Minh Đức; Nguyễn Cường Thịnh	Singapore; Lee Song Lim; Vincent Tang
Men's kodokan goshin jutsu	Vietnam; Phan Minh Hạnh; Trần Quốc Cường	Vietnam; Hà Minh Minh Đức; Nguyễn Cường Thịnh	Laos; Chindavon Syvanevilay; Phisath Sisaketh
Women's katame no kata	Vietnam; Nguyễn Tường Vy; Mai Thị Bích Trâm	Laos; Phonevan Syamphone; Viengxay Vilayphone	Vietnam; Trần Lê Phương Nga; Nguyễn Thùy Hải Châu
Women's katame no kata	Vietnam; Nguyễn Tường Vy; Mai Thị Bích Trâm	Laos; Phonevan Syamphone; Viengxay Vilayphone	Thailand; Pitima Thaweerattanasinp; Suphattra Jaikhumkao

=== Men's combat ===
Event	Gold	Silver	Bronze
55 kg	Nguyễn Hoàng Thành; Vietnam	Daryl John Mercado Honrada; Philippines	Chanthaphone Khamphounavong; Laos
55 kg	Nguyễn Hoàng Thành; Vietnam	Daryl John Mercado Honrada; Philippines	Jetsadakorn Suksai; Thailand
60 kg	Chu Đức Đạt; Vietnam	Soukphaxay Sithisane; Laos	Muhammad Alfiansyah; Indonesia
60 kg	Chu Đức Đạt; Vietnam	Soukphaxay Sithisane; Laos	Kiattisak Jaichuen; Thailand
66 kg	Shugen Nakano; Philippines	Trương Hoàng Phúc; Vietnam	Dewa Kadek Rama Warma Putra; Indonesia
66 kg	Shugen Nakano; Philippines	Trương Hoàng Phúc; Vietnam	Surasak Puntanam; Thailand
73 kg	Iksan Apriyadi; Indonesia	Keisei Nakano; Philippines	Nguyễn Hải Bá; Vietnam
73 kg	Iksan Apriyadi; Indonesia	Keisei Nakano; Philippines	Amir Daniel Abdul Majeed; Malaysia
90 kg	Lê Anh Tài; Vietnam	John Viron Ferrer; Philippines	Gede Ganding Kalbu Soethama; Indonesia
90 kg	Lê Anh Tài; Vietnam	John Viron Ferrer; Philippines	Wei Puyang; Thailand

=== Women's combat ===
Event	Gold	Silver	Bronze
45 kg	Đỗ Thu Hà; Vietnam	Pimngam Ngamluan; Thailand	Sel Wee; Myanmar
45 kg	Đỗ Thu Hà; Vietnam	Pimngam Ngamluan; Thailand	Maria Jeanalane Lopez Rodriguez; Philippines
48 kg	Hoàng Thị Tình; Vietnam	Wanwisa Muenjit; Thailand	Meli Rosita Marta; Indonesia
48 kg	Hoàng Thị Tình; Vietnam	Wanwisa Muenjit; Thailand	Leah Jhane Lopez Rodriguez; Philippines
52 kg	Nguyễn Thị Thanh Thủy; Vietnam	Khrizzie Pabulayan Mamero; Philippines	Aye Mar Lar; Myanmar
52 kg	Nguyễn Thị Thanh Thủy; Vietnam	Khrizzie Pabulayan Mamero; Philippines	Akari Warasiha; Thailand
57 kg	Rena Furukawa; Philippines	Chu Myat Noe Wai; Myanmar	Kamini Sri Segaran; Malaysia
57 kg	Rena Furukawa; Philippines	Chu Myat Noe Wai; Myanmar	Nguyễn Thị Bích Ngọc; Vietnam
62 kg	Nguyễn Thị Hường; Vietnam	Nwe Ni Pwint Hlaing; Myanmar	Eng Noun; Cambodia
62 kg	Nguyễn Thị Hường; Vietnam	Nwe Ni Pwint Hlaing; Myanmar	Megumi Kurayoshi; Philippines

=== Mixed combat ===
Event	Gold	Silver	Bronze
Team	Thailand; Prasit Poolklang; Wei Puyang; Masayuki Terada; Orapin Senatham; Surattana Thongsri; Ikumi Oeda	Indonesia; Qori Amrullah Al Haq Nugraha; I Gede Agastya Darma Wardana; Ni Kadek Anny Pandini; I Dewa Ayu Mira Widari; Gede Ganding Kalbu Soethama; Syerina	Philippines; Keisei Nakano Pablo; John Viron Ferrer Dalafu; Carl Dave Aseneta Malinao; Rena Furukawa Lanoy; Dylwynn Keith Gimena; Megumi Kurayoshi Delgado
Team	Thailand; Prasit Poolklang; Wei Puyang; Masayuki Terada; Orapin Senatham; Surattana Thongsri; Ikumi Oeda	Indonesia; Qori Amrullah Al Haq Nugraha; I Gede Agastya Darma Wardana; Ni Kadek Anny Pandini; I Dewa Ayu Mira Widari; Gede Ganding Kalbu Soethama; Syerina	Vietnam; Lê Anh Tài; Nguyễn Hải Bá; Nguyễn Châu Hoàng Lân; Nguyễn Thị Hường; Nguyễn Ngọc Diễm Phương; Hà Thị Nga
