= Ian Clark Bautista =

Filipino boxer (born 1994)

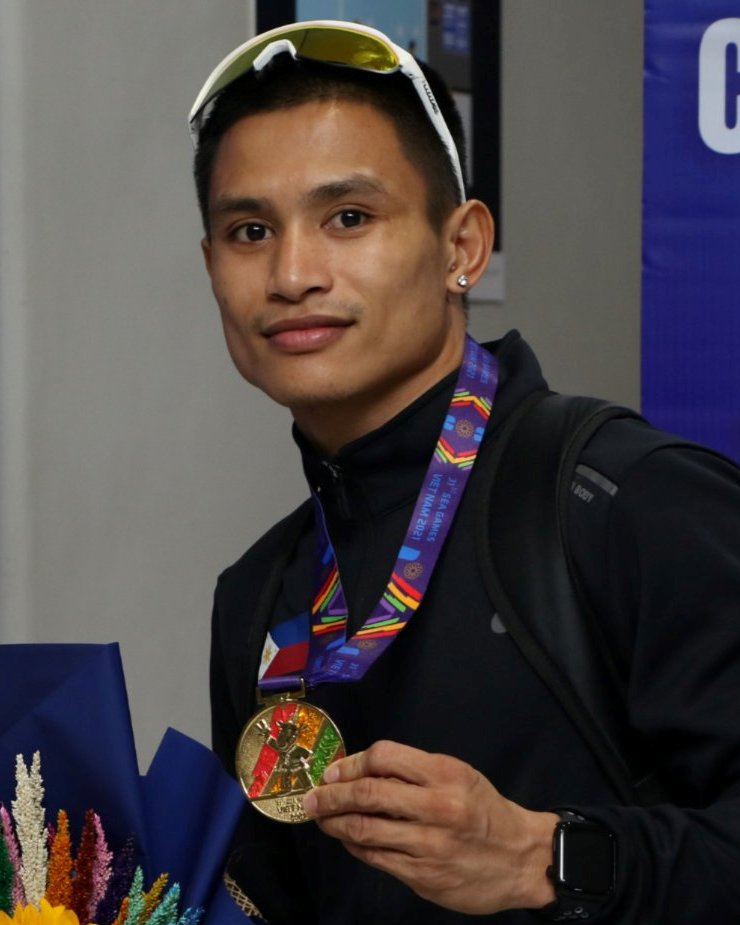
- Bautista in 2022

Personal information
- Nationality: Filipino
- Born: Ian Clark Pedres Bautista; October 31, 1994 (age 31) Binalbagan, Negros Occidental, Philippines

Sport
- Country: Philippines
- Sport: Boxing
Medal record
Representing Philippines
Asian Amateur Championships
| Bronze medal – third place | 2019 Bangkok | Bantamweight |
| Bronze medal – third place | 2024 Chiang Mai | Featherweight |
Southeast Asian Games
| Gold medal – first place | 2015 Singapore | Flyweight |
| Gold medal – first place | 2021 Vietnam | Bantamweight |
| Gold medal – first place | 2023 Cambodia | Featherweight |
| Bronze medal – third place | 2017 Kuala Lumpur | Flyweight |
| Bronze medal – third place | 2019 Philippines | Bantamweight |

Ian Clark Pedres Bautista (born October 31, 1994) is a Filipino boxer.

== Background ==
Bautista was born in from Binalbagan, Negros Occidental.

He was a participant in the 2014 Asian Games in South Korea. He was eliminated in the preliminary by South Korean boxer Choe Sang-don in a controversial bout which the Association of Boxing Alliances in the Philippines (ABAP) felt Bautista should have won. ABAP decided not to file a formal protest but urged organizers to probe "questionable" fights in the tournament in general.

Bautista had attempted to qualify for Olympics. He failed to qualify for the 2016 Summer Olympics in Rio de Janeiro having joined the AIBA World Olympic qualifier. He also tried to earn a berth in the 2020 Summer Olympics in Tokyo via the Asia & Oceania boxing Olympic qualifier. In his first match, he caused an upset by winning over Japanese boxer and former AIBA youth world champion Hayato Tsutsumi. However, his qualification bid ended in his following match against Chatchai-decha Butdee of Thailand.

Bautista has competed for his country in the Southeast Asian (SEA) Games. He won gold at the 2015 SEA Games in Singapore. However he would only settle for bronze in the next two iterations of the regional games in Malaysia (2017) and the Philippines (2019). He would regain his form by finishing as a gold medalist in the 2021 edition in Vietnam. He would win another gold medal in the 2023 edition in Cambodia.
