= Philippines at the 2021 SEA Games =

Philippines at the 2021 Southeast Asian Games
- IOC code: PHI
- NOC: Philippine Olympic Committee
- Website: www.olympic.ph

in Hanoi, Vietnam
- Competitors: 656 in 38 sports
- Flag bearers: Ernest John Obiena (Athletics - Pole Vault)
- Officials: 340
- Medals Ranked 4th: Gold 52 Silver 70 Bronze 105 Total 227

Southeast Asian Games appearances (overview)
- 1977; 1979; 1981; 1983; 1985; 1987; 1989; 1991; 1993; 1995; 1997; 1999; 2001; 2003; 2005; 2007; 2009; 2011; 2013; 2015; 2017; 2019; 2021; 2023; 2025; 2027; 2029

The Philippines participated at the 31st Southeast Asian Games which was held from 12 to 23 May 2022 in Hanoi, Vietnam.

The delegation finished fourth in the medal tally winning 52 gold, 70 silver and 104 bronze medals.

== Preparations ==
Philippine Sports Commission head Ramon Fernandez was appointed as the chef de mission for the Philippine delegation for the 2021 Southeast Asian Games. Preparations for the biannual tournament has been hampered by the COVID-19 pandemic, which also led to the cancellation of the 2020 ASEAN Para Games which was supposed to be hosted by the country.

The Philippines send 656 athletes competing in 39 sports for the 2021 Southeast Asian Games. The country compete in all sports except xiangqi. The contingent was trimmed down from 627 athletes due to budgetary constraints. The final delegation was expanded again. The final delegation consists of 981 people, among them are 641 athletes competing in 38 sports, 318 officials and 18 support staff members.

The PSC initially planned to regain supervision over the Rizal Memorial Sports Complex and PhilSports Complex, which were used as quarantine facilities for COVID-19 patients. so it could be used by athletes set to represent the country at the 2021 SEA Games as training venues by April 15, 2021. However, due to the re-imposition of enhanced community quarantine (ECQ) measures in the Greater Manila Area, such plans were scrapped and the country's national sports associations are tasked to set up their own training bubble elsewhere, where ECQ is not in place. The ongoing training of taekwondo and boxers at the Inspire Sports Academy in Calamba was also modified to individual workouts from face-to-face training for the entire duration of the ECQ.

Ernest John Obiena was designated as the delegation's flag bearer for the opening ceremony.

== Impact of the COVID-19 pandemic ==
On April 7, 2021, the Philippine Olympic Committee pledged that all athletes who will participate in the games would be given COVID-19 vaccines after securing a $40,000 grant from the Olympic Council of Asia. Al Panlilio was also tasked to head the vaccination program of the Philippine delegation for the 2021 SEA Games.

Athletes who tested positive for COVID-19 could be still replaced prior to the start of the games. This does not apply to the football teams which were allowed to include extra players.

At least three athletes tested positive for COVID-19. This include swimmer Luke Gebbie, national record holder for the 100-meter freestyle, who was rendered unable to compete.

== Medalists ==
Medalists are entitled to Incentives for Medalists in the Philippines incentive from the government through the Philippine Sports Commission per R.A. 10699.

=== Gold ===
No.	Medal	Name	Sport	Event	Date
1	Gold	Francine Padios	Pencak silat	Women's Single	11 May
2	Gold	Jack Escarpe	Kurash	Men's −73kg	13 May
3	Gold	Carlos Yulo	Gymnastics	Men's Artistic All-around	13 May
4	Gold	Gina Iniong-Araos	Kickboxing	Women's Low Kick −60 kg	13 May
5	Gold	Jean Claude Saclag	Kickboxing	Men's Low Kick −63.5 kg	13 May
6	Gold	Fernando Casares	Triathlon	Men's Triathlon Individual	14 May
7	Gold	Kim Mangrobang	Triathlon	Women's Triathlon Individual	14 May
8	Gold	Samantha Catantan	Fencing	Women's individual Foil	14 May
9	Gold	Ernest John Obiena	Athletics	Men's pole vault	14 May
10	Gold	Margarita Ochoa	Jujitsu	Women's -48kg	14 May
11	Gold	Annie Ramirez	Jujitsu	Women's -62kg	14 May
12	Gold	Aleah Finnegan; Chiara Andrew; Charlie Manzano; Lucia Gutierrez; Kursten Lopez; Ma. Cristina Onofre-Loberanes	Gymnastics	Women's artistic team	14 May
13	Gold	Agatha Wong	Wushu	Women's taolu taijijian	15 May
14	Gold	Kim Mangrobang	Duathlon	Women's Duathlon Individual	15 May
15	Gold	Carlos Yulo	Gymnastics	Men's Artistic Floor	15 May
16	Gold	Aleah Finnegan	Gymnastics	Women's Artistic Vault	15 May
17	Gold	Stephanie Sabalo; Michael Angelo Marquez	Dancesport	Single Dance - Latin Cha Cha	15 May
18	Gold	Arnel Mandal	Wushu	Men's sanda -56 kg	15 May
19	Gold	Carlos Yulo	Gymnastics	Men's Artistic Rings	15 May
20	Gold	William Morrison III	Athletics	Men's shot put	15 May
21	Gold	Merwin Tan	Bowling	Men's singles	16 May
22	Gold	Carlos Yulo	Gymnastics	Men's Artistic Vault	16 May
23	Gold	Ana Nualla; Sean Aranar	Dancesport	Standard - Tango	16 May
24	Gold	Ana Nualla; Sean Aranar	Dancesport	Standard - Viennese Waltz	16 May
25	Gold	Mary Joy Renigen; Mark Jayson Gayon	Dancesport	Standard - Slow Fox Trot	16 May
26	Gold	Clinton Kingsley Bautista	Athletics	Men's 110m hurdles	16 May
27	Gold	Ana Nualla; Sean Aranar	Dancesport	Standard - All Five Dances	16 May
28	Gold	Jocel Ninobla	Taekwondo	Women's individual Recognized Poomsae	16 May
29	Gold	Carlos Yulo	Gymnastics	Men's Artistic Horizontal Bar	16 May
30	Gold	Chloe Isleta	Swimming	Women's 200m backstroke	16 May
31	Gold	Rubilen Amit	Billiards	Women's 9-Ball Pool Singles	17 May
32	Gold	Richein Yosores; Islay Erika Bomogao	Muay Thai	Women's Waikru Mai	17 May
33	Gold	Eric Cray	Athletics	Men's 400m hurdles	17 May
34	Gold	Kurt Bryan Barbosa	Taekwondo	Men's under -54kg	17 May
35	Gold	Pia Elizabeth Bidaure; Monica Bidaure; Nicole Amistoso	Archery	Women's team recurve	18 May
36	Gold	Johann Chua	Billiards	Men's 9-Ball Pool Singles	18 May
37	Gold	Kayla Anise Richardson	Athletics	Women's 100m Dash	18 May
38	Gold	Charize "Yugen" Doble; Giana "Jeeya" Llanes; Angel "Angelailaila" Lozada; Christine "Rayray" Navidad; Rose Ann "Hell Girl" Robles; April "Aeae" Sotto	Esports	League of Legends: Wild Rift (Women's team)	18 May
39	Gold	Ian Dychangco; Ivan Malig; Patrick Nuqui; Merwin Tan	Bowling	Men's team of Four	19 May
40	Gold	Rena Furukawa	Judo	Women's -57kg	19 May
41	Gold	Kyle Dominic "Dominic" Soto; Danerie James "Wise" Del Rosario; Salic Alauya "Hadji" Imam; Lee Howard "Owl" Gonzales; Johnmar "OhMyV33NUS" Villaluna; Dexter Louise Cruz "Dexstar" Alaba; Russel Aaron "Eyon" Usi	Esports	Mobile Legends Bang Bang	20 May
42	Gold	Hidilyn Diaz	Weightlifting	Women's -55kg	20 May
43	Gold	Shugen Nakano	Judo	Men's -66kg	20 May
44	Gold	Rubilen Amit	Billiards	Women's 10-Ball Pool Singles	21 May
45	Gold	Treat Huey; Ruben Gonzales Jr.	Tennis	Men's doubles	21 May
46	Gold	Carlo Biado	Billiards	Men's 10-Ball Pool Singles	21 May
47	Gold	Vanessa Sarno	Weightlifting	Women's -71kg	21 May
48	Gold	Mai-loni Henson; Afril Bernardino; Janine Pontejos; Clare Castro; Khate Castillo; Ella Fajardo; Chack Cabinbin; Andrea Tongco; Gemma Miranda; Camille Clarin; Angel Surada; Kristine Cayabyab; Katrina Guytingco; Mikka Cacho; Karl Ann Pingol; Monique del Carmel	Basketball	5x5 Women's team	22 May
49	Gold	Rogen Ladon	Boxing	Men's Flyweight	22 May
50	Gold	Ian Clark Bautista	Boxing	Men's Bantamweight	22 May
51	Gold	Eumir Marcial	Boxing	Men's Middleweight	22 May
52	Gold	Phillip Delarmino	Muay Thai	Men's Combat 57 kg	22 May

=== Silver ===
No.	Medal	Name	Sport	Event	Date
1	Silver	Helen Aclopen	Kurash	Women's −48kg	10 May
2	Silver	Charmea Quelino	Kurash	Women's −52kg	10 May
3	Silver	Van Jacob Baccay; Mark Dubouzet; Andrew Michael Harris; Manuel Lasangue Jr. Jamael Pangandaman; John Michael Pasco; Rey Joshua Tabuzo; Josef Valdez; Dhane Varela; Daryoush Zandi	Beach Handball	Men's team	11 May
4	Silver	Cris Nievarez; CJ Jasmin	Rowing	Men's lightweight double sculls	11 May
5	Silver	Sydney Sy-Tancontian	Kurash	Women's −87kg	11 May
6	Silver	Jones Inso	Wushu	Men's taolu Taijiquan	13 May
7	Silver	Carlos Yulo; Jan Gwynn Timbang; Juancho Miguel Besana; John Ivan Cruz; Justine Ace De Leon; John Matthew Vergara	Gymnastics	Men's artistic team	13 May
8	Silver	Renalyn Dacquel	Kickboxing	Women's Full Contact −48kg	13 May
9	Silver	Gretel De Paz	Kickboxing	Women's Full Contact −56kg	13 May
10	Silver	Zephania Ngaya	Kickboxing	Women's Full Contact −65kg	13 May
11	Silver	Claudine Veloso	Kickboxing	Women's Low Kick −52kg	13 May
12	Silver	Kim Remolino	Triathlon	Men's Triathlon Individual	14 May
13	Silver	Joanie Delgaco	Rowing	Women's single sculls	14 May
14	Silver	Agatha Wong	Wushu	Women's taolu Taijiquan	14 May
15	Silver	Kyla Ashley Richardson	Athletics	Women's 200 Meters	14 May
16	Silver	Carlo Angelo Pena	Jujitsu	Men's -62kg	14 May
17	Silver	Noelito Jose, Jr.	Fencing	Men's individual Epee	14 May
18	Silver	Hokkett Delos Santos	Athletics	Men's pole vault	14 May
19	Silver	Aleah Finnegan	Gymnastics	Women's Artistic All-around	14 May
20	Silver	Wilbert Aunzo; Pearl Marie Cañeda	Dancesport	Single Dance - Latin Samba	15 May
21	Silver	Nathaniel Perez	Fencing	Men's individual Foil	15 May
22	Silver	Jollirine Co	Jujitsu	Women's -45kg	15 May
23	Silver	Stephanie Sabalo; Michael Angelo Marquez	Dancesport	Single Dance - Latin Jive	15 May
24	Silver	Janry Ubas	Athletics	Men's long jump	15 May
25	Silver	Stephanie Sabalo; Michael Angelo Marquez	Dancesport	Latin - All Five Dances	15 May
26	Silver	Jessica Geriane	Swimming	Women's 50m backstroke	15 May
27	Silver	Aries Toledo	Athletics	Men's Decathlon	15 May
28	Silver	Rafael Enrico Mella; Patrick King Perez; Rodolfo Reyes Jr.	Taekwondo	Men's team poomsae	16 May
29	Silver	Juvenile Crisostomo; Jeordan Dominguez; Kobe Macario; Nikki Oliva; Darius Venerable	Taekwondo	Men's team Mixed Freestyle Poomsae	16 May
30	Silver	Aleah Finnegan	Gymnastics	Women's balance beam	16 May
31	Silver	Carlos Yulo	Gymnastics	Men's Artistic Parallel Bars	16 May
32	Silver	Mary Joy Renigen; Mark Jayson Gayon	Dancesport	Standard - Waltz	16 May
33	Silver	Mary Joy Renigen; Mark Jayson Gayon	Dancesport	Standard - Quickstep	16 May
34	Silver	Marie Alexis Sy	Bowling	Woman's Singles	16 May
35	Silver	Samantha Catantan; Maxine Esteban; Wilhelmina Lozada; Justine Gail Tinio	Fencing	Women's team Foil	17 May
36	Silver	Mark Harry Diones	Athletics	Men's triple jump	17 May
37	Silver	Sarah Dequinan Noveno	Athletics	Women's Heptatlon	17 May
38	Silver	Chloe Isleta	Swimming	Women's 100m backstroke	17 May
39	Silver	Jefrey Roda	Billiards	Men's 6-Red Snooker Singles	17 May
40	Silver	Jefferson Manatad	Wrestling	Men's Greco Roman -87kg	17 May
41	Silver	Carlo Biado	Billiards	Men's 9-Ball Pool Singles	18 May
42	Silver	Richard Gonzales; John Russel Misal	Table Tennis	Men's doubles	18 May
43	Silver	Baby Jessica Canabal	Taekwondo	Women's -53kg	18 May
44	Silver	Dave Cea	Taekwondo	Men's -74kg	18 May
45	Silver	Jiah Pingot	Wrestling	Women's freestyle 50kg	18 May
46	Silver	Minalyn Foy-os	Wrestling	Women's freestyle 57kg	18 May
47	Silver	Noemi Tener	Wrestling	Women's freestyle 76kg	18 May
48	Silver	Kirstie Alora	Taekwondo	Women's freestyle 73kg	18 May
49	Silver	Jasmine Alkhaldi; Chloe Isleta; Desirey Mangaoang; Miranda Renner	Swimming	Women's 4x100m medley relay	18 May
50	Silver	Christine Hallasgo	Athletics	Women's Marathon	19 May
51	Silver	Paulo Bersamina; Darwin Laylo	Chess	Men's team Rapid	19 May
52	Silver	Paul Marton Dela Cruz; Jennifer Dy Chan	Archery	Mixed team compound	19 May
53	Silver	Keisei Nakano	Judo	Men's -73kg	19 May
54	Silver	John Viron Ferrer	Judo	Men's -90kg	19 May
55	Silver	Alvin Lobreguito	Wrestling	Men's freestyle 57kg	19 May
56	Silver	Ronil Tubog	Wrestling	Men's freestyle 74kg	19 May
57	Silver	Jhonny Morte	Wrestling	Men's freestyle 65kg	19 May
58	Silver	Khrizzie Pabulay	Judo	Women's -52kg	20 May
59	Silver	Carlo Vonn Buminaang	Vovinam	Men's -65kg	20 May
60	Silver	Chezka Centeno	Billiards	Women's 10-Ball Pool Singles	21 May
61	Silver	Jeson Patrombon; Francis Alcantara	Tennis	Men's doubles	21 May
62	Silver	Janelle Mae Frayna; Shania Mae Mendoza Garcia	Chess	Women's team Blitz	21 May
63	Silver	Elreen Ando	Weightlifting	Women's -64kg	21 May
64	Silver	Johann Chua	Billiards	Men's 10-Ball Pool Singles	21 May
65	Silver	Daryl John Mercado	Judo	Men's 55 kg	21 May
66	Silver	Dennis "ZDD" Ramos Jr; Aldrin "Aldrin" Borabon; John Kenneth "zYK" Alde; Matthew "EL1"Arnaez PM; Christian "Revenge" Amorea	Esports	Crossfire	22 May
67	Silver	Andre Dominique "Calumnia" Soriano; David Emmanuel "yjyyyyyyyyyy" Tapang; Jan Edward "Creshowo" Hortizuela; Jan Raphael "RVL8" Retance; Hezro Elijah "ParzivaI" Canlas; Van Matthew "Vansu" Alfonso	Esports	League of Legends (PC)	22 May
68	Silver	Thirdy Ravena; Kib Montalbo; Kiefer Ravena; Jaydee Tungcab; Moala Tautuaa; Isaac Go; June Mar Fajardo; Roger Pogoy; LeBron Lopez; Troy Rosario; William Navarro; Matthew Wright	Basketball	Men's 5x5	22 May
69	Silver	Irish Magno	Boxing	Women's Flyweight	22 May
70	Silver	Alexander Topacio	Shooting	Men's Trap	22 May

=== Bronze ===
No.	Medal	Name	Sport	Event	Date
1	Bronze	George Angelo Baclagan	Kurash	Men's −90kg	10 May
2	Bronze	Joanie Delgaco; Amelyn Pagulayan; Mirelle Qua; Kristine Paraon	Rowing	Women's Quadruple Sculls	11 May
3	Bronze	Jefferson Loon; James Mayagma; Rick Ortega	Pencak silat	Men's team	11 May
4	Bronze	Renzo Miguel Cazeñas	Kurash	Men's −81kg	11 May
5	Bronze	Al Rolan Llamas	Kurash	Men's −60kg	11 May
6	Bronze	Zuriel Sumintac; Roque Abala; Joachim De Jesus; Edgar Ilas	Rowing	Men's lightweight coxless four	13 May
7	Bronze	Feiza Lenton; Alyssa Go; Joanie Delgaco; Kharl Juliann Sha	Rowing	Women's Lightweight Quadruple Sculls	13 May
8	Bronze	CJ Jasmin; Van Maxilom; Athens Tolentino; EJ Obaña	Rowing	Men's Lightweight Quadruple Sculls	13 May
9	Bronze	Bianca Mae Estrella	Kurash	Women's −70kg	13 May
10	Bronze	Emmanuel Cantores	Kickboxing	Men's Low Kick −60kg	13 May
11	Bronze	Honorario Banario	Kickboxing	Men's Low Kick −71kg	13 May
12	Bronze	Estie Gay Liwanen	Kurash	Women's −57kg	13 May
13	Bronze	Jones Inso	Wushu	Men's taolu taijijian	14 May
14	Bronze	Raven Alcoseba	Triathlon	Women's Triathlon Individual	14 May
15	Bronze	Cris Nievarez	Rowing	Men's Lightweight Single Sculls	14 May
16	Bronze	Edgar Ilas; Zuriel Sumintac	Rowing	Men's Lightweight Pair	14 May
17	Bronze	Kayla Anise Richardson	Athletics	Women's 200 Meters	14 May
18	Bronze	Alfrence Braza	Athletics	Men's 1500 Meters	14 May
19	Bronze	Melvin Calano	Athletics	Men's javelin throw	14 May
20	Bronze	Joida Gagnao	Athletics	Women's 5,000m	14 May
21	Bronze	Joyme Sequita; Bernalyn Bejoy; Jessel Lumapas; Edgardo Alejan Jr.	Athletics	4x400m Mixed Relay	14 May
22	Bronze	Reymar Caduyac; Brandon Ganuelas-Rosser; Jorey Napoles; Marvin Hayes	Basketball	3X3 Men's team	14 May
23	Bronze	Miranda Renner	Swimming	Women's 100m freestyle	14 May
24	Bronze	Divine Wally	Wushu	Women's -48 kg	14 May
25	Bronze	Gideon Fred Padua	Wushu	Men's -60 kg	14 May
26	Bronze	Francisco Solis	Wushu	Men's -65 kg	14 May
27	Bronze	Clemente Tabugara	Wushu	Men's -70 kg	14 May
28	Bronze	Jeson Patrombon; Ruben Gonzales Jr. Treat Huey; Francis Alcantara; Eric Olivares Jr.	Tennis	Men's team	15 May
29	Bronze	Marian Jade Capadocia; Alex Eala; Jenaila Rose Prulla; Shaira Hope Rivera	Tennis	Women's team	15 May
30	Bronze	Alvin Campos	Pencak silat	Men's tanding class F (70-75 kg)	15 May
31	Bronze	Naomi Gardoce	Cycling	Women's individual Mountain Bike Downhill	15 May
32	Bronze	Jerick Farr	Cycling	Men's individual Mountain Bike Downhill	15 May
33	Bronze	Wilbert Aunzo; Pearl Marie Cañeda	Dancesport	Single Dance - Latin Rumba	15 May
34	Bronze	Wilbert Aunzo; Pearl Marie Cañeda	Dancesport	Single Dance - Latin Paso Doble	15 May
35	Bronze	Jan Vincent Cortez	Jujitsu	Men's -56kg	15 May
36	Bronze	Marc Alexander Lim	Jujitsu	Men's -69kg	15 May
37	Bronze	Sonny Wagdos	Athletics	Men's 5000 m	15 May
38	Bronze	Joida Gagnao	Athletics	Women's 3000 m Steephlecase	15 May
39	Bronze	Janry Ubas	Athletics	Men's Decathlon	15 May
40	Bronze	Christian Jhester Concepcion; Daniel Eunice Villanueva; Sandro Antonio Sia; John Paul Dayro	Fencing	Men's team sabre	16 May
41	Bronze	Anna Gabriella Guinto; Ivy Claire Dinoy; Wilhelmina Lozada; Justine Gail Tinio	Fencing	Women's team Epee	16 May
42	Bronze	Juancho Miguel Besana	Gymnastics	Men's vault	16 May
43	Bronze	Jerico Rivera	Cycling	Men's Mountain Bike Cross-Country	16 May
44	Bronze	Jelly Dianne Paragile	Athletics	Women's 100m hurdles	16 May
45	Bronze	Alyana Joyce Nicolas	Athletics	Women's pole vault	16 May
46	Bronze	Robyn Brown	Athletics	Women's 400m hurdles	17 May
47	Bronze	William Morrison III	Athletics	Men's discus throw	17 May
48	Bronze	Laila Delo	Taekwondo	Women's under -67kg	17 May
49	Bronze	Noel Norada	Wrestling	Men's Greco Roman -67kg	17 May
50	Bronze	Margarito Angana Jr.	Wrestling	Men's Greco Roman -60kg	17 May
51	Bronze	Jessica Joy Geriane	Swimming	Women's 100m backstroke	17 May
52	Bronze	Mark Joseph Gonzales; Rheyjey Ortouste; Ronsted Gabayeron; John Bobier; Jason Huerte	Sepak Takraw	Men's regu	17 May
53	Bronze	Jason Balabal	Wrestling	Men's Greco Roman -97kg	17 May
54	Bronze	Nathaniel Perez; Sammuel Tranquilan; Prince Felipe; Michael Nicanor	Fencing	Men's team Foil	18 May
55	Bronze	Jylyn Nicanor; Queen Denise Dalmacio; Allaine Nicole Cortey; Kemberly Camahalan	Fencing	Women's team sabre	18 May
56	Bronze	Francisco Dela Cruz	Billiards	Men's 1-Cushion Carom Singles	18 May
57	Bronze	Lois Kaye Go; Rianne Malixi; Maria Rafaela Singson	Golf	Women's team	18 May
58	Bronze	Jayson Ramil Macaalay	Karate	Men's -60kg	18 May
59	Bronze	Jamie Lim	Karate	Women's -61kg	18 May
60	Bronze	Efren Reyes	Billiards	Men's 1-Cushion Carom Singles	18 May
61	Bronze	Rebecca Torres	Karate	Women's individual Kata	18 May
62	Bronze	John Enrico Vasquez	Karate	Men's individual Kata	18 May
63	Bronze	Evalyn Palabrica	Athletics	Women's javelin throw	18 May
64	Bronze	Grace Loberanes	Wrestling	Women's freestyle -53kg	18 May
65	Bronze	Robyn Brown; Bernalyn Bejoy; Jessel Lumapas; Maureen Schrijvers	Athletics	Women's 4x100m Relay	18 May
66	Bronze	Jenelyn Olsim	Vovinam	Women's -55kg	18 May
67	Bronze	Hermie Macaranas; Ojay Fuentes	Canoeing/Kayak	Men's canoe Double 1,000m	19 May
68	Bronze	Janelle Mae Frayna; Antoinnette San Diego	Chess	Women's team Rapid	19 May
69	Bronze	Paul Marton Dela Cruz; Florante Matan; Johann Olaño	Archery	Men's team compound	19 May
70	Bronze	Rosegie Ramos	Weightlifting	Women's -49kg	19 May
71	Bronze	Breanna Labadan	Gymnastics	Women's Rhythmic Individual All Around	19 May
72	Bronze	Samuel Thomas Harper Morrison	Taekwondo	Men's -80kg	19 May
73	Bronze	Israel Cesar Cantos	Taekwondo	Men's -87kg	19 May
74	Bronze	Ivan Christopher Agustin	Karate	Men's 84kg Kumite	19 May
75	Bronze	Nicole Erika Dantes; Rebecca Torres; Sarah Pangilinan	Karate	Women's team Kata	19 May
76	Bronze	Remon Misu Villanueva	Karate	Women's 68kg Kumite	19 May
77	Bronze	Megumi Kurayoshi	Judo	Women's -63kg	19 May
78	Bronze	James Palicte	Boxing	Men's Lightweight	19 May
79	Bronze	Jason Balabal	Wrestling	Men's freestyle 97kg	19 May
80	Bronze	Josie Gabuco	Boxing	Women's light flyweight	19 May
81	Bronze	Riza Pasuit	Boxing	Women's Featherweight	19 May
82	Bronze	Alex Eala; Treat Huey	Tennis	Mixed doubles	19 May
83	Bronze	Jasmine Alkhaldi	Swimming	Aquatics Swimming Women's 100m butterfly	19 May
84	Bronze	Jason Huerte; Rheyjey Ortouste; Mark Joseph Gonzales	Sepak takraw	Men's doubles	19 May
85	Bronze	Alex Eala	Tennis	Women's singles	20 May
86	Bronze	Jude Garcia; Anthony Lemuel Arbasto Jr. Alnakran Abdilla; Jaron Requinton	Volleyball	Men's Beach Volleyball	20 May
87	Bronze	Sisi Rondina; Bernadeth Pons; Jovelyn Gonzaga; Floremel Rodriguez	Volleyball	Women's Beach Volleyball	20 May
88	Bronze	Janelle Mae Frayna	Chess	Women's individual Blitz	20 May
89	Bronze	Jamie Lim; Junna Tsukii; Mae Soriano; Remon Misu Villanueva	Karate	Women's team kumite	20 May
90	Bronze	Marjon Piañar	Boxing	Men's welterweight	20 May
91	Bronze	Mauro Lumba	Muay Thai	Men's Combat 81 kg	20 May
92	Bronze	Fritz Biagtan	Muay Thai	Men's Combat 60 kg	20 May
93	Bronze	Nesthy Petecio	Boxing	Women's Lightweight	20 May
94	Bronze	Maria Jeanalane Lopez	Judo	Women's -45kg	21 May
95	Bronze	Daniel Quizon; Jan Emmanuel Garcia	Chess	Men's team Blitz	21 May
96	Bronze	Ariel Lampacan	Muay Thai	Men's Combat 54kg	21 May
97	Bronze	Rudzma Abubakar	Muay Thai	Women's combat 48kg	21 May
98	Bronze	Leah Jhane Lopez	Judo	Women's 48 kg	21 May
99	Bronze	April Joy La Madrid	Muay Thai	Women's combat 60kg	21 May
100	Bronze	Tahnai Annis; Sarina Bolden; Ryley Bugay; Anicka Castañeda; Malea Cesar; Alisha del Campo; Isabella Flanigan; Carleigh Frilles; Sofia Harrison; Kaya Hawkinson; Hali Long; Eva Madarang; Chantelle Maniti; Olivia McDaniel; Jessica Miclat; Inna Palacios; Quinley Quezada; Dominique Randle; Camille Rodriguez; Jaclyn Sawicki	Football	Women's team	21 May
101	Bronze	Charmaine Dolar	Gymnastics	Aerobic Women's individual	22 May
102	Bronze	Zephania Ngaya Pag-a	Vovinam	Women's -60kg	22 May
103	Bronze	Romina Gavino; Raissa Gavino; Denise Manguiat; Sam Doragos	Finswimming	Women's 4x100m Surface	22 May
104	Bronze	Keisei Nakano; John Viron Ferrer; Carl Dave Aseneta; Rena Furukawa; Dylwynn Keith Gimena; Megumi Kurayoshi	Judo	Mixed Team	22 May
105	Bronze	Carlos Carag	Shooting	Men's Trap	22 May

== Multiple medalists ==
Name	Sport	Gold	Silver	Bronze	Total
Carlos Yulo	Gymnastics	5	2	0	7
Sean Mischa Aranar	Dancesport	3	0	0	3
Ana Leonila	Dancesport	3	0	0	3
Aleah Finnegan	Gymnastics	2	2	0	4
Rubilen Amit	Billiards	2	0	0	2
Kim Mangrobang	Triathlon/Duathlon	2	0	0	2
Merwin Tan	Bowling	2	0	0	2
Mark Jayson Gayon	Dancesport	1	2	0	3
Chloe Isleta	Swimming	1	2	0	3
Michael Angelo Marquez	Dancesport	1	2	0	3
Mary Joy Renigen	Dancesport	1	2	0	3
Stephanie Sabalo	Dancesport	1	2	0	3
Carlo Biado	Billiards	1	1	0	2
Samantha Catantan	Fencing	1	1	0	2
Johann Chua	Billiards	1	1	0	2
Agatha Wong	Wushu	1	1	0	2
Treat Huey	Tennis	1	0	2	3
Rena Furukawa	Judo	1	0	1	2
Ruben Gonzales	Tennis	1	0	1	2
William Morrison	Athletics	1	0	1	2
Kayla Anise Richardson	Athletics	1	0	1	2
Wilbert Aunzo	Dancesport	0	1	2	3
Pearl Marie Cañeda	Dancesport	0	1	2	3
Joanie Delgaco	Rowing	0	1	2	3
Janelle Mae Frayna	Chess	0	1	2	3
Francis Alcantara	Tennis	0	1	1	2
Jasmine Alkhaldi	Swimming	0	1	1	2
Juancho Miguel Besana	Gymnastics	0	1	1	2
Paul Marton Dela Cruz	Archery	0	1	1	2
John Viron Ferrer	Judo	0	1	1	2
Jessica Geriane	Swimming	0	1	1	2
Jones Llabres Inso	Wushu	0	1	1	2
CJ Jasmin	Rowing	0	1	1	2
Wilhelmina Lozada	Fencing	0	1	1	2
Keisei Nakano	Judo	0	1	1	2
Cris Nievarez	Rowing	0	1	1	2
Jeson Patrombon	Tennis	0	1	1	2
Nathaniel Perez	Fencing	0	1	1	2
Miranda Renner	Swimming	0	1	1	2
Justine Gail Tinio	Fencing	0	1	1	2
Janry Ubas	Athletics	0	1	1	2
Alex Eala	Tennis	0	0	3	3
Robyn Brown	Athletics	0	0	2	2
Joida Gagnao	Athletics	0	0	2	2
Mark Joseph Gonzales	Sepak takraw	0	0	2	2
Jason Huerte	Sepak takraw	0	0	2	2
Edgar Ilas	Rowing	0	0	2	2
Megumi Kurayoshi	Judo	0	0	2	2
Jamie Lim	Karate	0	0	2	2
Rheyjey Ortouste	Sepak takraw	0	0	2	2
Zuriel Sumintac	Rowing	0	0	2	2
Rebecca Torres	Karate	0	0	2	2
Remon Misu Villanueva	Karate	0	0	2	2

== Medal summary ==
=== By sports ===
Sport	1st place, gold medalist(s)	2nd place, silver medalist(s)	3rd place, bronze medalist(s)	Total	Rank
Archery	1	1	1	3	4
Athletics	5	7	14	26	3
Basketball	1	1	1	3	2
Billiards	4	4	2	10	1
Beach Handball	0	1	0	1	3
Bowling	2	1	0	3	2
Boxing	3	1	5	9	3
Canoeing/Kayak	0	0	1	1	6
Chess	0	2	3	5	3
Cycling	0	0	3	3	6
Dancesport	5	5	2	12	1
Duathlon	1	0	0	1	1
Esports	2	2	0	4	3
Fencing	1	3	4	8	3
Finswimming	0	0	1	1	4
Football	0	0	1	1	3
Golf	0	0	1	1	5
Gymnastics	7	4	3	14	2
Judo	2	4	4	10	2
Jujitsu	2	2	2	6	1
Karate	0	0	8	8	6
Kickboxing	2	4	2	8	3
Kurash	1	3	5	9	2
Muay Thai	2	0	5	7	3
Pencak silat	1	0	2	3	6
Rowing	0	2	6	8	3
Sepak Takraw	0	0	2	2	7
Shooting	0	1	1	2	7
Swimming	1	3	3	7	6
Table Tennis	0	1	0	1	5
Taekwondo	2	5	3	10	3
Tennis	1	1	4	6	3
Triathlon	2	1	1	4	1
Vovinam	0	1	2	3	7
Volleyball	0	0	2	2	4
Weightlifting	2	1	1	4	4
Wrestling	0	7	5	12	3
Wushu	2	2	5	9	4
Total	52	70	105	227	4

=== By date ===
Day	Date	1st place, gold medalist(s)	2nd place, silver medalist(s)	3rd place, bronze medalist(s)	Total
-2	10 May	0	2	1	3
-1	11 May	1	3	4	8
0	12 May	Opening ceremony			
1	13 May	4	6	7	17
2	14 May	7	8	15	30
3	15 May	8	8	12	28
4	16 May	10	7	6	23
5	17 May	4	6	8	18
6	18 May	4	9	13	26
7	19 May	2	8	18	28
8	20 May	3	2	9	14
9	21 May	4	6	7	17
10	22 May	5	5	5	15
11	23 May	Closing ceremony			
Total		52	70	105	227

== Athletics ==
Men's

Athlete	Event	Heats			Final	
Athlete	Event	Heat	Time	Rank	Time	Rank
Anfernee Lopena	100m	1	10.72	5 Q	10.90	8
Eric Cray	100m	2	10.94	4	did not advance	
Frederick Ramirez	400 m	1	48.29	2 Q	47.54	4
Micheal Del Prado	400 m	2	49.17	4 Q	47.70	6
Edwin Giron Jr.	800 m	—N/a			01:58.020	5
Alfrence Braza	1500 m	—N/a			03:56.35	3rd place, bronze medalist(s)
Mariano Manzano	1500 m	—N/a			03:57.18	5
Alfrence Braza	5000 m	—N/a			16:35:95	4
Sonny Wagdos Montenegro	5000 m	—N/a			16:35:89	3rd place, bronze medalist(s)
Clinton Bautista	110m hurdles	—N/a			13.79	1st place, gold medalist(s)
Alvin Vergel	110m hurdles	—N/a			14.73	6
Eric Cray	400m hurdles	1	52.65	2 Q	50.410	1st place, gold medalist(s)
Francis Medina	400m hurdles	2	53.65	1 Q	51.770	5
Junel Gobotia	3000 m steeplechase	—N/a			09:20.310	4
Clinton Bautitsa; Eric Cray; Anfernee Lopena; Aries Toledo	4 × 100 m Relay	—N/a			00.00	DNF
Frederick Ramirez; Michael Del Prado; Joyme Sequita; Edgar Alejan jr.	4 × 400 m Relay	—N/a			03:14.08	4
Jerald Zabala	Marathon	—N/a				DNF
Richard Salano	Marathon	—N/a			02:34.550	7
Leonard Grospe	High Jump	—N/a			2.04 m	7
Ernest John Obiena	Pole Vault	—N/a			5.46 m GR	1st place, gold medalist(s)
Hokkett Delos Santos	Pole Vault	—N/a			5.00 m	2nd place, silver medalist(s)
Janry Ubas	Long Jump	—N/a			7.73 m	2nd place, silver medalist(s)
Mark Harry Diones	Triple Jump	—N/a			15.87 m	2nd place, silver medalist(s)
Ronne Malipay	Triple Jump	—N/a			15.34 m	8
William Morrison III Edward	Shot Put	—N/a			18.14 m GR	1st place, gold medalist(s)
John Albert Mantua Casol	Shot Put	—N/a			16.96 m	4
William Morrison III Edward	Discus Throw	—N/a			50.44 m	3rd place, bronze medalist(s)
John Albert Mantua Casol	Discus Throw	—N/a			00.00	NM
Arniel Ferrera	Hammer Throw	—N/a			50.14 m	4
Melvin Calano	Javelin Throw	—N/a			66.86 m	3rd place, bronze medalist(s)

Athlete	Event	100m	LJ	SP	HJ	400 m	110m H	DT	PV	JV	1500m	Total	Rank
Janry Ubas	Decathlon	11.09; 000	7.71 m 000	11.44 m 000	2.04 m 000	52.53; 000	15.66; 000	34.05 m 000	4.40 m 000	52. 85 m 000	000	6,977 pts	3rd place, bronze medalist(s)
Aries Toledo	Decathlon	10.85; 000	7.22 m 000	11.92 m 000	1.86 m 000	48.18; 000	14.76; 000	38.10 m 000	4.20 m 000	53.79 m 000	000	7,469 pts	2nd place, silver medalist(s)

Women's

Athlete	Event	Heats			Final	
Athlete	Event	Heat	Time	Rank	Time	Rank
Kayla Richardson	100 m	2	12.02	2 Q	11.60	1st place, gold medalist(s)
Kyla Richardson	100 m	—N/a				DNS
Kayla Richardson	200 m	1	23.87	1 Q	23.87	3rd place, bronze medalist(s)
Kyla Richardson	200 m	2	23.90	1 Q	23.56	2nd place, silver medalist(s)
Maureen Emily Schrijvers	400 m	—N/a			56.85	5
Jessel Lumapas	400 m	—N/a			58.30	7
Bernalyn Bejoy	800 m	—N/a				DNS
Melissa Escoton	100m hurdles	—N/a			13.86	4
Jelly Dianne Paragile	100m hurdles	—N/a			13.72	3rd place, bronze medalist(s)
Robyn Lauren Brown	400 Hurdles	—N/a			56.440	3rd place, bronze medalist(s)
Joida Gagnao	5000 m	—N/a			17:37.74	3rd place, bronze medalist(s)
Kayla Richardson; Kyla Richardson; Eloiza Luzon-Medina; Katherine Santos	4 × 100 m Relay	—N/a			46.35	5
Robyn Brown; Bernalyn Bejoy; Jessel Lumapas; Maureen Schrijvers	4 × 400 m Relay	—N/a			03:43.26	3rd place, bronze medalist(s)
Christine Hallasgo	Marathon	—N/a			02:56.070	2nd place, silver medalist(s)
Joida Gagnao	3000m Steeplechase	—N/a			10:41:69	3rd place, bronze medalist(s)
Natalie Uy	Pole Vault	—N/a			0.00	NM
Alayana Joyce Nicolas	Pole Vault	—N/a			3.60 m	3rd place, bronze medalist(s)
Marestella Sunang	long Jump	—N/a			5.92 m	7
Katherine Khay Santos	long Jump	—N/a			6.00 m	4
Evalyn Pabrica	Javeline Throw	—N/a			49.07 m	3rd place, bronze medalist(s)

Athlete	Event	100m H	HJ	SP	200 m	LJ	JT	800m	Total	Rank
Sarah Dequinan	Heptathlon	14.44; 917	1.62 m 759	11.12; 603	25.2; 847	0.00; 000	00.00; 000	2:25.25; 000	5,382 pts	2nd place, silver medalist(s)
Alexie Mae Caimoso	Heptathlon	15.10; 828	1.50 m 621	9.98 m 528	26.10; 768	0.00; 000	00.00; 000	0:00.00; 000	4,375 pts	5

Mixed

Athlete	Event	Heats			Final	
Athlete	Event	Heat	Time	Rank	Time	Rank
Kyla Richardson; Anfernee Lopena; Kayla Richardson; Eric Cray	4 × 100 m	—N/a			TBD	-
Joyme Sequita; Bernalyn Bejoy; Jessel Lumapas; Edgardo Alejan Jr.	4 × 400 m	—N/a			03:31.53	3rd place, bronze medalist(s)

== Basketball ==
The 3x3 teams failed to defend their title.

Summary

Team	Event	Qualifying Round							Semifinal	Final / BM	
Team	Event	Opposition Score	Opposition Score	Opposition Score	Opposition Score	Opposition Score	Opposition Score	Rank	Opposition Score	Opposition Score	Rank
Philippines men's	Men's 3x3	Cambodia; W 19–7	Thailand; W 21–16	Indonesia; L 13–15	Singapore; W 21–16	Malaysia; W 21–14	Vietnam; L 14–21	2	Thailand; L 17–21	Indonesia; W 14–10	3rd place, bronze medalist(s)
Philippines Women's	Women's 3x3	Cambodia; W 21–5	Vietnam; L 18–21	Thailand; L 14–21	Singapore; W 20–14	Indonesia; L 12–21	Malaysia; W 13–11	4	Thailand; L 14–21	Indonesia; L 10–16	4
Philippines men's	Men's 5x5	Thailand; W 76–73	Cambodia; W 100–32	Singapore; W 88–37	Vietnam; W 88–60	Malaysia; W 87–44	Indonesia; L 81–85	—N/a			2nd place, silver medalist(s)
Philippines Women's	Women's 5x5	Indonesia; W 93–77	Thailand; W 97–81	Vietnam; W 118–87	Singapore; W 90–61	Malaysia; L 93–96	—N/a				1st place, gold medalist(s)

== Badminton ==
Men

Athlete	Event	Quarterfinal	Semifinal	Final / BM	
Athlete	Event	Opposition Score	Opposition Score	Opposition Score	Rank
1. Ros Leonard Pedrosa; 2. Christian Bernardo / Paul John Pantig; 3. Jewel Albo; 4. Solomon Padiz Jr. / Julius Villabrille; 5. Julius Villabrille	Team	Thailand (THA); L 0–3	did not advance		

Women

Athlete	Event	Quarterfinal	Semifinal	Final / BM	
Athlete	Event	Opposition Score	Opposition Score	Opposition Score	Rank
1. Janelle Anne Andres; 2. Nicole Albo / Thea Pomar; 3. Mikaela de Guzman; 4. Eleanor Inlayo / Susmita Ramos; 5. Sarah Joy Barredo	Team	Singapore (SIN); L 0–3	did not advance		

== Bodybuilding ==
The Philippines entered nine bodybuilders. However, none were able to fulfill prior competition requirements which the IFBB Philippines says it was unaware of.

- Edward Alido (men's 55kg)
- Leidon Cruz (men's 60kg)
- Alexis Abule (men's 65kg)
- Roderick Ternida (men's 70kg)
- Homer Valmonte (men's 75kg)
- Jesse Virata (men's 80kg)
- Renz Murphy Alimorong (men's athletic physique)
- Jose Mari Jereza Jr. (mixed pairs)
- Lorelei Rosa Deloria (mixed pairs)

== Bowling ==
Men

Athlete	Event	Total	Rank
Merwin Tan	Singles	1,292 pts	1st place, gold medalist(s)
Ivan Dominic Malig	Singles	1,087 pts	11

Women

Athlete	Event	Total	Rank
Marie Alexis Sy	Singles	1,320 pts	2nd place, silver medalist(s)
Maria Lourdes Arles	Singles	1,031 pts	11

== Boxing ==
Athlete	Event	Preliminaries	Quarterfinals	Semifinals	Final	
Athlete	Event	Opposition Result	Opposition Result	Opposition Result	Opposition Result	Rank
Rogen Ladon	Men's flyweight	N/A	Muhammad Abdul Qalyum (MAS); W 5–0	Thanarat Saengphet (THA); W 3–2	Trần Văn Thảo (VIE); W 3–2	1st place, gold medalist(s)
Ian Clark Bautista	Men's bantamweight	N/A	Mohamed Hanurdeen (SGP); W 5–0	Sao Rangsey (CAM); W 5–0	Naing Latt (MYA); W 5–0	1st place, gold medalist(s)
James Palicte	Men's light flyweight	Vũ Thành Đạt (VIE); W 4–1	Touch Davit (CAM); W KO	Farrand Papendang (INA); L 0–3	Did not advance	3rd place, bronze medalist(s)
Marjon Piañar	Men's welterweight	N/A	Bye	Sarohatua Lumbantobing (INA); L 1–4	Did not advance	3rd place, bronze medalist(s)
Eumir Marcial	Men's middleweight	N/A	Bye	Peerapat Yeasungnoen (THA); W RSC–I	Delio Anzaqeci Mouzinho (TLS); W 5–0	1st place, gold medalist(s)
Josie Gabuco	Women's light flyweight	N/A	N/A	Chuthamat Raksat (THA); L 1–4	Did not advance	3rd place, bronze medalist(s)
Irish Magno	Women's flyweight	N/A	Bye	Novita Sinadia (INA); W 5–0	Nguyễn Thị Tâm (VIE); L 2–3	2nd place, silver medalist(s)
Riza Pasuit	Women's featherweight	N/A	Bye	Vương Thị Vỹ (VIE); L 0–5	Did not advance	3rd place, bronze medalist(s)
Nesthy Petecio	Women's lightweight	N/A	Kay Thwe Nyein (MYA); W 5–0	Trần Thị Linh (THA); L 2–3	Did not advance	3rd place, bronze medalist(s)

== Chess ==
Men

Athlete	Event	Round 1	Round 2	Round 3	Round 4	Round 5	Round 6	Round 7	Round 8	Round 9	Final	Rank
Athlete	Event	Opposition Score	Opposition Score	Opposition Score	Opposition Score	Opposition Score	Opposition Score	Opposition Score	Opposition Score	Opposition Score	Opposition Score	Rank
John Paul Gomez	Individual Standard	Son Nguyen Ngoc Trung (VIE); D 0.5–0.5	Nay Oo Kyaw Tun (MYA); W 1–0	Truong (VIE); L 0–1		Jingyao (SIN); W 1–0	Kyaw Tun (MYA); W 1–0					
Daniel Quizon	Individual Standard	Li Tian Yeoh (MAS); L 0–1	Sanchez (PHI); D 0.5–0.5	Jingyao (SIN); W 1–0	Lik Zang (MAS); W 1–0	Truong (VIE); D 0.5–0.5	Li Tian (MAS); D 0.5–0.5					

Women

Athlete	Event	Round 1	Round 2	Round 3	Round 4	Round 5	Round 6	Round 7	Round 8	Round 9	Final	Rank
Athlete	Event	Opposition Score	Opposition Score	Opposition Score	Opposition Score	Opposition Score	Opposition Score	Opposition Score	Opposition Score	Opposition Score	Opposition Score	Rank
Janelle Mae Frayna	Individual Standard	Irine Kharisma Sukandar (INA); D 0.5–0.5	Pascua (PHI); W 1–0	Frayna (PHI); D 0.5–0.5	Qianyun (SIN); W 1–0	Ting Tan (MAS); W 1–0	Thi Kim (VIE); W 1–0					
Jan Jodilyn Fronda	Individual Standard	Sukandar (INA); D 1–1	Ting Tan (MAS); W 1–0	Thi Kim (VIE); L 0–1	Araya (THA); D 0.5–0.5	Bao Tram (VIE); W 1–0	Munajjah (MAS); W 1–0					

== Cycling ==
Mountain

Athlete	Event	Seeding run		Final	
Athlete	Event	Time	Rank	Time	Rank
Jerico Rivera Cruz	Men's cross country	—N/a		1:20:04.00	3rd place, bronze medalist(s)
Edmhel John Flores Rivera	Men's cross country	—N/a		1:24:04.00	7
Mark Louwel Valderama Antonio	Men's cross country	—N/a		1:27:20.00	11
John Derick Farr Tobias	Men's downhill Individual	—N/a		03:13:13.80	3rd place, bronze medalist(s)
Eleazar Jr. Barba Tia	Men's downhill Individual	—N/a		03:19:47.10	5
Eusebia Nicole Quiñones	Women's cross country	—N/a		01:28:48.000	5
Ariana Thea Patrice Dormitorio Evangelista	Women's cross country	—N/a		01:32:38.000	8
Shagne Paula Yaoyao Hermosilla	Women's cross country	—N/a		01:33:14.000	9
Naomi Gardoce Mapanao	Women's downhill Individual	—N/a		03:44:77.20	3rd place, bronze medalist(s)
Lea Denise Belgira Cataluña	Women's downhill Individual	—N/a		07:03:85.40	7

== Diving ==
Philippines sent a lone female athlete.

Women

Athlete	Event	Final	
Athlete	Event	Points	Rank
Ariana Drake	1m springboard	207.15	4
Ariana Drake	3m springboard	229.80	4

== Esports ==
=== CrossFire ===
Team	Group Stage					Rank
Team	Opposition Score	Opposition Score	Opposition Score	Opposition Score	Opposition Score	Rank
Philippines						

=== FIFA Online 4 ===
The Philippines were grouped in Group A along with Malaysia and host Vietnam. They did not manage to win any game, consequentially failing progress out of the group stage.

Athletes	Group Stage		Semifinal	Final	Rank
Athletes	Opposition Score	Opposition Score	Semifinal	Final	Rank
Jorrel "Rell" Aristorenas; Aljhon "Foureyes" Cañas; Rad "Radalad" Novales	Malaysia; L 0–3	Vietnam; L 0–3	did not advance		

=== League of Legends ===
Team	Group Stage					Rank
Team	Opposition Score	Opposition Score	Opposition Score	Opposition Score	Opposition Score	Rank
Philippines						

=== Arena of Valor ===
Team	Group Stage					Rank
Team	Opposition Score	Opposition Score	Opposition Score	Opposition Score	Opposition Score	Rank
Philippines						

=== Garena Free Fire ===
Team	Group Stage			
Team	Day 1		Overall Day 2	
Team	Score	Rank	Score	Rank
God Ascends; Team 1	41 pts	9	79 pts	10
Rise Esports; Team 2	45 pts	7	99 pts	9

=== League of Legends: Wild Rift (Mobile) ===
Team	Group Stage					Semifinal	Final	
Team	Opposition Score	Opposition Score	Opposition Score	Opposition Score	Rank	Opposition Score	Opposition Score	Rank
Philippines men's	Thailand; L 0–1	Malaysia; L 0-1	Thailand; L 0-1	did not advance				
Philippines women's	Thailand; W 1–0	Singapore; W 1-0	Laos; W 1-0	Vietnam; W 1-0	1	Thailand; W 3-1	Singapore; W 3-0	1st place, gold medalist(s)

=== Mobile Legends: Bang Bang ===
Team	Group Stage				Semifinal	Final	
Team	Opposition Score	Opposition Score	Opposition Score	Rank	Opposition Score	Opposition Score	Rank
Philippines	Malaysia; W 2–0	Laos; W 2-0	Myanmar; W 2-0	1	Singapore; W 2-1	Indonesia; W 3-1	1st place, gold medalist(s)

=== PUBG Mobile (Individual) ===
Athlete	Day 1		Overall Day 2	
Athlete	Score	Rank	Score	Rank
PHI1Monboy1	23 pts	34	34 pts	44
PHI1Rankid1	23 pts	36	60 pts	24
PHI1H2R	44 pts	7	80 pts	7
PHI2Newbie	12 pts	48	28 pts	47
PHI2Rymon1	41 pts	8	92 pts	5
PHI2Range	35 pts	16	77 pts	11

=== PUBG Mobile (Team) ===
Team	Qualifiers		Finals				Finals Overall	
Team	Score	Rank	Score	Rank	Score	Rank	Score	Rank
Damaso, demigod, H2R monboy, rankid Team 1	20 pts	13	75 pts	1	85 pts	7	113 pts	9
newbie, opti, Range rymon, Shazaaam; Team 2	17 pts	15	60 pts	3	110 pts	2	135 pts	5

== Football ==
Summary

Team	Event	Group Stage					Semifinal	Final / BM	
Team	Event	Opposition Score	Opposition Score	Opposition Score	Opposition Score	Rank	Opposition Score	Opposition Score	Rank
Philippines men's	Men's tournament	Timor-Leste; W 4–0	Vietnam; D 0–0	Myanmar; L 2–3	Indonesia; L 0–4	4	did not advance		7
Philippines Women's	Women's tournament	Cambodia; W 5–0	Vietnam; L 1–2	—N/a		2	Thailand; L 0–3	Myanmar; W 2–1	3rd place, bronze medalist(s)

== Gymnastics ==
Men

Athlete	Event	Scores	Total	Rank
Carlos Yulo	Team All-around	85.150	301.600	2nd place, silver medalist(s)
John Matthew Vergara	Team All-around	42.450	301.600	2nd place, silver medalist(s)
Justine Ace De leon	Team All-around	59.600	301.600	2nd place, silver medalist(s)
John Ivan Cruz	Team All-around	37.850	301.600	2nd place, silver medalist(s)
Juancho Miguel Besana	Team All-around	71.750	301.600	2nd place, silver medalist(s)
Jan Gwynn Timbang	Team All-around	71.800	301.600	2nd place, silver medalist(s)

Men

	Athlete	Scores	Rank
Individual All-around	Carlos Yulo	85.150	1st place, gold medalist(s)
Individual All-around	Juancho Miguel Besana	71.750	9
Individual All-around	Jan Gwynn Timbang	71.800	8
Floor	Carlos Yulo	15.200	1st place, gold medalist(s)
Floor	John Ivan Cruz	13.833	4
Vault	Carlos Yulo	14.700	1st place, gold medalist(s)
	Juancho Miguel Besana	14.017	3rd place, bronze medalist(s)
Still Rings	Carlos Yulo	14.400	1st place, gold medalist(s)
Pommel Horse	Carlos Yulo	11.733	6
	Jan Gwynn Timbang	11.200	8
Parallel Bar	Carlos Yulo	14.900	2nd place, silver medalist(s)
	Juancho Miguel Besana	11.900	5
High Bar	Carlos Yulo	13.867	1st place, gold medalist(s)
	Juancho Miguel Besana	12.100	4

Women

Athlete	Event	Scores	Total	Rank
Aleah Finnegan	Team All-around	49.250	184.500	1st place, gold medalist(s)
Chiara Andrew	Team All-around	46.050	184.500	1st place, gold medalist(s)
Charlie Manzano	Team All-around	32.400	184.500	1st place, gold medalist(s)
Lucia Gutierrez	Team All-around	42.400	184.500	1st place, gold medalist(s)
Kursten Lopez	Team All-around	29.500	184.500	1st place, gold medalist(s)
Ma. Cristina Onofre	Team All-around	23.750	184.500	1st place, gold medalist(s)
Aleah Finnegan	Vault	13.133		1st place, gold medalist(s)
Ancilla Lucia Mari Manzano	Vault	12.150		5
Aleah Finnegan	Beam Balance	12.367		2nd place, silver medalist(s)
Ancilla Lucia Mari Manzano	Beam Balance	10.000		7

== Handball ==
=== Beach handball ===
Team	Event	Group Stage						
Team	Event	Opposition Score	Opposition Score	Opposition Score	Opposition Score	Opposition Score	Opposition Score	Rank
Philippine men's	Men's tournament	Thailand; W 2–0	Vietnam; L 0–2	Singapore; W 2–0	Thailand; W 2–1	Vietnam; L 1–2	Singapore; W 2–0	2nd place, silver medalist(s)

== Kickboxing ==
Men

Athlete	Event	Quarterfinal	Semifinal	Final	Final
Athlete	Event	Opposition Score	Opposition Score	Opposition Score	Rank
Daryl Chutipas Fegcan	Full Contact −51kg	Salmri Stendra Pattisamallo (INA); L 0–3	did not advance		
Esteban Jomar Balangui	Full Contact −57 kg	Toch Rachnan (CAM); L 1–2	did not advance		
Nehyeban Carlos Alvarez	Full Contact −67 kg	Nguyễn Thế Hưởng (VIE); L 0–3	did not advance		
Kurt Lubrica Ludan	Low Kick −54 kg	Chaiwat Sungnoi (THA); L 1–2	did not advance		
Emmanuel Cantores Dailay	Low Kick −60 kg	Ain Kamarrudi Ain (MAS); W 3–0	Nguyễn Quang Huy (VIE); L 0–3	Did not advance	3rd place, bronze medalist(s)
Jean Claude Saclag	Low Kick −63.5 kg	Latxasak Souliyavong (LAO); W 3–0	Vũ Trường Giang (VIE); W 3–0	Chaleamlap Santidongsakun (THA); W 3–0	1st place, gold medalist(s)
Honorio Banario Antonio	Low Kick −71 kg	Yermias Yohanes Tanoi (INA); W 3–0	Lvay Chhoeung (CAM); L 0–3	Did not advance	3rd place, bronze medalist(s)

Women

Athlete	Event	Quarterfinal	Semifinal	Final	Final
Athlete	Event	Opposition Score	Opposition Score	Opposition Score	Rank
Renalyn Dacquel Dasalla	Full Contact −48 kg	Bye	Boonpeng Kanwara (THA); W 3–0	Nguyễn Thị Hằng Nga (VIE); L 0–3	2nd place, silver medalist(s)
Gretel De Paz Cordero	Full Contact −56 kg	Bye	Surachada Namrak (THA); W 2–1	Diandra Ariesta Pieter (INA); L 0–3	2nd place, silver medalist(s)
Zephania Ngaya	Full Contact −65 kg	Bye	Bye	Huỳnh Thị Kim Vàng (VIE); L 0–3	2nd place, silver medalist(s)
Claudine Veloso Decena	Low Kick 52 kg	Bye	Bùi Hải Linh (VIE); W 3–0	Amanda La Loupatty (INA); L 0–3	2nd place, silver medalist(s)
Gina Araos Iniong	Low Kick 60 kg	Bye	Hayatun Najihin Radzuan (MAS); W 3–0	Waraporn Jaiteang (THA); W 3–0	1st place, gold medalist(s)

== Pencak silat ==
seni

Athlete	Event	Elimination Rounds	Semifinal	Final	
Athlete	Event	Opposition Score	Opposition Score	Opposition Score	Rank
Edmar Tacuel Tagube	Men's tunggal	Suhaimi (BRU); L 9.950–9.960	did not advance		
Mary Francine Padios	Women's tunggal	Nurisan Loseng (THA); W 9.945–9.910	Vương Thị Bình (VIE); W 9.945 (3:00)–9.945 (3:01)	Puspa Arumsari (INA); W 9.960–9.945	1st place, gold medalist(s)

Tanding

Athlete	Event	Quarterfinals	Semifinals	Final	
Athlete	Event	Opposition Result	Opposition Result	Opposition Result	Rank
Dines Dumaan	Men's Class B (50–55kg)	Nguyen Dinh Tuan (VIE); L 31–43	did not advance		
John Nicholas Adante	Men's Class C (55–60kg)	Muhammad Yachser Arafa (INA); L 28–68	did not advance		
Mark James Lacao	Men's Class D (60–65kg)	Ahmad Atif Irshad Bin Zahidi (MAS); DQ	did not advance		
Alvin Campos	Men's Class F (70–75kg)	Kuibrohem Kubaha (THA); W 36–10	Tran Dinh Nam (VIE); L	did not advance	3rd place, bronze medalist(s)
Raymund Bueno	Men's Class G	Nyugen Tan Sang (VIE); L 0-3	did not advance		
Jhon Paul Acat	Men's Class H	Mohammad Amiruddin Bin Adzmi (MAS); L 0-3	did not advance		

== Rowing ==
Men

Athlete	Event	Heats		Final	
Athlete	Event	Time	Rank	Time	Rank
Emmanuel Joseph Obaña Cortes; Christian Joseph Jasmin Del Rosario; Van Adrian Maxilom Dela Cerna; Athens Greece Tolentino Andrade	Quadruple sculls	07:11.220	4	time	4
Cris Masasigan Nievarez	Lightweight single sculls	07:20.974	3	time	3rd place, bronze medalist(s)
Christian Joseph Jasmin Del Rosario; Cris Marasigan Nievarez	Lightweight double sculls	06:22.18	1	07:05.585	2nd place, silver medalist(s)
Christian Joseph Jasmin Del Rosario; Athens Greece Tolentino Andrade; Roque Jr Abala Laniog; Cris Marasigan Nievarez	Lightweight quadruple	06:24.644	2	time	3rd place, bronze medalist(s)
Joachim De Jesus Diomampo; Zuriel Sumintac Gumi-as; Roque Jr Abala Laniog; Edgar Ilas Recaña	Lightweight coxless four	06:44.13	3	time	3rd place, bronze medalist(s)
Zuriel Sumintac Gumi-as; Edgar Ilas Recaña	Lightweight pair	07:01.983	3	time	3rd place, bronze medalist(s)

Women

Athlete	Event	Heats		Final	
Athlete	Event	Time	Rank	Time	Rank
Joanie Delgaco Talagtag	Single sculls	08:03.453	2	time	2nd place, silver medalist(s)
Josephine Mireille Qua Sycip; Amelyn Pagulayan Salarzon	Double sculls	07:48.366	5	time	5
Kristine Paraon Ramirez; Josephine Mireille Qua Sycip; Amelyn Pagulayan Salarzon; Joanie Delgaco Talagtag	Quadruple sculls	10:65.00	3	07:28.879	3rd place, bronze medalist(s)
Kristine Paraon Ramirez; Amelyn Pagulayan Salarzon	Pair		5		5
Alyssa Hannah Marciana Go Chong Muñoz; Feiza Jane Lenton Bulado	Lightweight double sculls	07:46.557	4	time	4
Alyssa Hannah Marciana Go Chong Muñoz; Feiza Jane Lenton Bulado; Kharl Julianne Sha Bengco; Joanie Delgaco Talagtag	Lightweight quadruple sculls	07:29.14	3	time	3rd place, bronze medalist(s)
Alyssa Hannah Marciana Go Chong Muñoz; Feiza Jane Lenton Bulado; Kharl Julianne Sha Bengco; Joanie Delgaco Talagtag	Lightweight coxless four	07:28.663	5	time	5

== Tennis ==
The International Tennis Federation (ITF) and Asian Tennis Federation (ATF) allowed the participation of Filipino players despite the suspension of the Philippine Tennis Association.

- Jeson Patrombon
- Francis Casey Alcantara
- Ruben Gonzales
- Treat Huey
- Eric Olivarez Jr.
- Shaira Rivera
- Jennayla Trulla
- Marian Capadocia
- Alex Eala

== Triathlon/Duathlon ==
=== Triathlon ===
Athlete	Event	Swim (1.5 km)	Trans 1	Bike (40 km)	Trans 2	Run (10 km)	Total Time	Rank
Fernando Jose Casares	Men's Triathlon						01:56.57	1st place, gold medalist(s)
Andrew Kim Remolino	Men's Triathlon						01:59.16	2nd place, silver medalist(s)
Kim Mangrobang	Women's Triathlon						02:13.31	1st place, gold medalist(s)
Raven Faith Alcoseba Tan	Women's Triathlon						02:18.30	3rd place, bronze medalist(s)

=== Duathlon ===
Athlete	Event	Bike (40 km)	Trans 2	Run (10 km)	Total Time	Rank
Raymund Torio Molano	Men's Duathlon					
John Leerams Chicano	Men's Duathlon					
Kim Mangrobang	Women's Duathlon				02:13:12.00	1st place, gold medalist(s)
Alexandra Dumaran Ganzon	Women's Duathlon				02:23:09.00	8

== Volleyball ==
=== Indoor Volleyball ===
Philippines Men's Volleyball team failed to defend their silver medal last Southeast Asian Games 2019.

Team	Event	Preliminary round					Semi Finals / PF	Finals / BM / PF	
Team	Event	Opposition Score	Opposition Score	Opposition Score	Opposition Score	Rank	Opposition Score	Opposition Score	Rank
Philippine Women's	Women's tournament	Malaysia; W 3–0; 25–15, 25–20, 25–14	Thailand; L 0–3; 15–25, 13–25, 14–25	Indonesia; L 1–3; 23–25, 25–21, 15–25, 20–25	Vietnam; L 0–3; 23–25, 19–25, 17–25	4	—N/a	Indonesia; L 1–3; 21–25, 25–22, 19–25, 21–25	4
Philippine Men's	Men's tournament	Cambodia; L 1–3; 21–25, 26–24, 28–30, 27–29	Thailand; L 0–3; 20–25, 27–29, 22–25	—N/a		3	Malaysia; W 3–0; 25–12, 25–13, 25–12	Myanmar; W 3–2; 26–24, 22–25, 25–22, 27–29, 16–14,	5

=== Beach Volleyball ===
Summary

Team	Event	Qualifying Round						Semifinal	Final / BM	
Team	Event	Opposition Score	Opposition Score	Opposition Score	Opposition Score	Opposition Score	Rank	Opposition Score	Opposition Score	Rank
Garcia; Arbasto; Team 1	Men's Beach Volleyball	Singapore; W 2–0; 21-15, 21-17	Cambodia; W 2–0; 21-15, 21-16	Vietnam; L 1-2; 15-21, 21-17, 12-15; Golden Match (Garcia/Requinton); W 2-0; 21-18, 21-15	—N/a		1	Thailand; L 0-2; 20-22, 14-21; Golden Match (Garcia/Requinton); L 0-2; 18-21, 18-21	Vietnam; W 2–0; 21-19, 21-19; Golden Match (Garcia/Requinton); W 2-0; 21-15, 18-19	3rd place, bronze medalist(s)
Abdilla; Requinton; Team 2	Men's Beach Volleyball	Singapore; W 2–0; 22-20, 21-16	Cambodia; W 2–0; 21-14, 21-14	Vietnam; W 2-1; 19-21. 21-16, 15-13; Golden Match (Garcia/Requinton); W 2-0; 21-18, 21-15	—N/a		1	Thailand; W 2–0; 21-19, 21-13; Golden Match (Garcia/Requinton); L 0-2; 18-21, 18-21	Vietnam; L 0-2; 19-21, 18-21; Golden Match (Garcia/Requinton); W 2-0; 21-15, 18-19	3rd place, bronze medalist(s)
Rondina; Pons; Team 1	Women's Beach Volleyball	Singapore; W 2–0; 21-14, 21-9	Malaysia; W 2-0; 21-11, 21-9	Indonesia; L 0-2; 19-21, 17-21; Golden Match; L 0-2; 15-21, 19-21	Vietnam; W 2-0; 21-16, 21-12	Thailand; L 0-2; 20-22, 15-21	3	—N/a	Vietnam; W 2-1; 20-22, 21-18, 25-12	3rd place, bronze medalist(s)
Gonzaga; Rodriguez; Team 2	Women's Beach Volleyball	Singapore; W 2–0; 21-12, 21-8	Malaysia; W 2-0; 21-14, 21-9	Indonesia; W 2-0; 21-13, 21-19	Vietnam; W 2-0; 21-13, 22-20	Thailand; L 0-2; 18-21, 15-21	3	—N/a	Vietnam; W 2-0; 21-17, 21-16	3rd place, bronze medalist(s)

== Weightlifting ==
=== Men's ===
Athlete	Event	Snatch		Clean & Jerk		Total	Rank
Athlete	Event	Result	Rank	Result	Rank	Total	Rank
Fernando Agad, Jr.	Men's −55 kg	113	3	135	5	248	5
Rowel Garcia	Men's −61 kg	123 NR	4	150	4	273 NR	4
Nestor Colonia	Men's −67 kg	125	4	150	4	275	4
Denmark Lemon	Men's −73 kg	130 NR	5	165 NR	4	295 NR	4
John Kevin Padullo	Men's −89 kg	125 NR	5	160 NR	5	285 NR	5
John Tabique	Men's +89 kg	143	4	179	5	322	5

=== Women's ===
Athlete	Event	Snatch		Clean & Jerk		Total	Rank
Athlete	Event	Result	Rank	Result	Rank	Total	Rank
Mary Flor Diaz	Women's −45 kg	71 NR	4	87	4	158	4
Rosegie Ramos	Women's −49 kg	81 NR	3	98 NR	3	179 NR	3rd place, bronze medalist(s)
Hidilyn Diaz	Women's −55 kg	92	2	114	1	206	1st place, gold medalist(s)
Margaret Colonia	Women's −59 kg	83	4	105	4	188	4
Elreen Ando	Women's −64 kg	103 NR	2	120	2	223 NR	2nd place, silver medalist(s)
Vanessa Sarno	Women's −71 kg	104 MR	1	135 MR	1	239 MR	1st place, gold medalist(s)
Kristel Macrohon	Women's −71+ kg	95	4	133	4	228	4
