= Ye Tun Naung (bodybuilder) =

Burmese bodybuilder

- Professional bodybuilder

Personal info
- Born: 1991 (age 34–35); Myanmar

Best statistics

Ye Tun Naung (Burmese: ရဲထွန်းနောင်) is a Burmese professional bodybuilder, and a two-time Asian Bodybuilding and Fitness Championship winner in the 70 kg category.

He is also winner of the Bodybuilding Below 75 kg category at the 2018 International Federation of BodyBuilding & Fitness Pro League Men of Steel Malaysia and Men's Physique Pro class 2020.

== Career ==
Ye won the gold medal at the 13th Asian Bodybuilding and Fitness Championships, held in Bangkok, Thailand in 2016. In 2017, he won the gold medal at the 51st Asian Bodybuilding and Fitness Championships held in South Korea.

On 2018, he became the first Burmese bodybuilder to win a gold medal in a competition at the Bodybuilding Below 75 kg category at the 2018 International Federation of BodyBuilding & Fitness Pro League Men of Steel held in Malaysia.

In 2020, he won the VX Classic Grand Bodybuilding competition (Pro class), which was held at Junction Square in Yangon.

== Competitive placings ==
- 2016 13th Asian Bodybuilding and Physique Sports Championship
- 2017 51st Asian Bodybuilding and Fitness Championships ( gold medal at the 70kg body building competition)
- 2018 Pro League Men of Steel Malaysia (first runner up)
- 2020 VX Classic Grand Bodybuilding competition (1st runner up- Pro class)
