= Vietnam at the 2021 SEA Games =

Vietnam at the 2021 Southeast Asian Games
- IOC code: VIE
- NOC: Vietnam Olympic Committee

in Hanoi, Vietnam
- Competitors: 965 in 40 sports
- Flag bearer: Nguyễn Huy Hoàng (Swimming)
- Medals Ranked 1st: Gold 205 Silver 125 Bronze 116 Total 446

Southeast Asian Games appearances (overview)
- 1989; 1991; 1993; 1995; 1997; 1999; 2001; 2003; 2005; 2007; 2009; 2011; 2013; 2015; 2017; 2019; 2021; 2023; 2025; 2027; 2029

Vietnam competed in the 2021 Southeast Asian Games in Hanoi as host nation from 12 to 23 May 2022. The Vietnamese contingent consists of 965 athletes, competing in all 40 sports.

The host Vietnam emerged in the medal tally as the overall champions after nineteen years recording 205 gold medals (the most by any country thus far) along with 125 silvers and 106 bronzes, accumulating 446 total medals in total.

== Medal summary ==
=== Medal by sport ===
Medals by sport
Sport	1st place, gold medalist(s)	2nd place, silver medalist(s)	3rd place, bronze medalist(s)	Total	Rank
Archery	0	4	1	5	6
Athletics	22	14	8	44	1
Badminton	0	0	3	3	5
Basketball	0	2	0	2	4
Billiards	2	2	4	8	2
Bodybuilding	5	2	1	8	1
Bowling	0	0	0	0	-
Boxing	3	2	2	7	2
Canoeing	8	4	2	14	1
Chess	7	2	3	12	1
Cycling	4	2	0	6	1
Dancesport	5	1	5	11	2
Diving	0	2	2	4	3
Duathlon/Triathlon	1	0	0	1	2
Esports	4	3	0	7	1
Fencing	5	1	5	11	2
Finswimming	10	5	3	18	1
Football	2	0	0	2	1
Futsal	0	1	1	2	2
Golf	0	0	0	0	-
Gymnastics	7	7	8	22	1
Handball	3	0	0	3	1
Judo	9	2	4	15	1
Jujitsu	2	1	2	5	2
Karate	7	2	6	15	1
Kickboxing	5	0	6	11	1
Kurash	7	5	5	17	1
Muaythai	4	6	1	11	1
Pencak silat	6	2	5	13	1
Pétanque	1	3	3	7	3
Rowing	8	6	2	16	1
Sepak takraw	0	3	3	6	4
Shooting	7	6	4	17	2
Swimming	11	11	3	25	2
Table tennis	1	0	4	5	3
Taekwondo	9	5	3	17	1
Tennis	1	2	3	6	2
Volleyball	0	2	0	2	3
Vovinam	6	6	2	14	1
Weightlifting	3	4	4	11	2
Wrestling	17	1	0	18	1
Wushu	10	3	7	20	1
Xiangqi	3	1	1	5	1
Total	205	125	116	446	1

=== Medal by date ===
Medals by date
Day	Date	1st place, gold medalist(s)	2nd place, silver medalist(s)	3rd place, bronze medalist(s)	Total
-4	8 May	0	1	1	2
-3	9 May	0	1	0	1
-2	10 May	4	2	8	14
-1	11 May	6	3	7	16
0	12 May	Opening ceremony			
1	13 May	14	6	7	27
2	14 May	15	17	8	40
3	15 May	29	16	13	58
4	16 May	20	8	13	41
5	17 May	17	11	8	36
6	18 May	21	11	9	41
7	19 May	27	15	11	53
8	20 May	11	6	18	35
9	21 May	17	9	8	34
10	22 May	24	19	5	48
Total		205	125	116	446

=== Medalists ===
Medal	Name	Sport	Event	Date
Gold	Đặng Ngọc Xuân Thiện; Văn Vĩ Lương; Trịnh Hải Khang; Nguyễn Văn Khánh Phong; Đinh Phương Thành; Lê Thanh Tùng	Gymnastics	Men's team	13 May
Gold	Đặng Ngọc Xuân Thiện	Gymnastics	Men's pommel horse	15 May
Gold	Đinh Phương Thành	Gymnastics	Men's parallel bars	16 May
Gold	Đinh Phương Thành	Gymnastics	Men's horizontal bar	16 May
Silver	Nguyễn Tùng Dương; Phương Thế Anh	Diving	Men's synchronized 3 metre springboard	8 May
Silver	Mai Hồng Hạnh; Ngô Phương Mai	Diving	Women's synchronized 3 metre springboard	9 May
Silver	Lê Thanh Tùng	Gymnastics	Men's all-around	13 May
Silver	Đỗ Thị Ngọc Hương; Trương Khánh Vân; Phạm Như Phương; Nguyễn Thị Quỳnh Như; Lâm Như Quỳnh; Trần Đoàn Quỳnh Nam	Gymnastics	Women's team	14 May
Silver	Nguyễn Thị Quỳnh Như	Gymnastics	Women's vault	15 May
Silver	Phạm Như Phương	Gymnastics	Women's uneven bars	15 May
Silver	Nguyễn Văn Khánh Phong	Gymnastics	Men's rings	15 May
Bronze	Ngô Phương Mai	Diving	Women's 1 metre springboard	8 May
Bronze	Đinh Phương Thành	Gymnastics	Men's all-around	13 May
Bronze	Trịnh Hải Khang	Gymnastics	Men's floor exercise	15 May
Bronze	Phạm Như Phương	Gymnastics	Women's balance beam	16 May
Bronze	Lê Thanh Tùng	Gymnastics	Men's parallel bars	16 May
Bronze	Phạm Như Phương	Gymnastics	Women's floor exercise	16 May
Bronze	Lê Thanh Tùng	Gymnastics	Men's horizontal bar	16 May

== Diving ==
Vietnam will be sending a total of 9 divers.

Men

Athlete	Event	Final	
Athlete	Event	Result	Rank
Phương Thế Anh	1m springboard	248.25	5
Nguyễn Tùng Dương	1m springboard	223.10	6
	3m springboard		
Nguyễn Tùng Dương; Phương Thế Anh	Synchronized 3m springboard	305.64	2nd place, silver medalist(s)
	Synchronized 10m platform		

Women

Athlete	Event	Final	
Athlete	Event	Result	Rank
Ngô Phương Mai	1m springboard	224.00	3rd place, bronze medalist(s)
Nguyễn Phương Anh	1m springboard	162.95	7
	3m springboard		
Mai Hồng Hạnh; Ngô Phương Mai	Synchronized 3m springboard	237.67	2nd place, silver medalist(s)

== Football ==
Summary

Key:

- A.E.T – After extra time.
- P – Match decided by penalty-shootout.

Team	Event	Group Stage					Semifinal	Final / BM	
Team	Event	Opposition Score	Opposition Score	Opposition Score	Opposition Score	Rank	Opposition Score	Opposition Score	Rank
Vietnam men's	Men's tournament	Indonesia; W 3–0	Philippines; D 0–0	Myanmar; W 0-1	Timor-Leste; W 0-2	1 Q	Malaysia; W 0–1	Thailand; W 0–1	1st place, gold medalist(s)

=== Men's ===
Head coach: (South Korea) Park Hang-seo

No.	Pos.	Player	Date of birth (age)	Club
1	GK	Quan Văn Chuẩn	7 January 2001 (age 25)	(Vietnam Football Federation) Hà Nội
2	DF	Lê Văn Xuân	27 February 1999 (age 27)	(Vietnam Football Federation) Hà Nội
3	DF	Vũ Tiến Long	4 April 2002 (age 24)	(Vietnam Football Federation) Hà Nội
4	DF	Nguyễn Thanh Bình	2 November 2000 (age 25)	(Vietnam Football Federation) Viettel
5	DF	Lương Duy Cương	7 November 2001 (age 24)	(Vietnam Football Federation) SHB Đà Nẵng
6	MF	Dụng Quang Nho	1 January 2000 (age 26)	(Vietnam Football Federation) Hải Phòng
7	DF	Lê Văn Đô	7 August 2001 (age 24)	(Vietnam Football Federation) Phố Hiến
8	MF	Nguyễn Hai Long	27 August 2000 (age 25)	(Vietnam Football Federation) Hà Nội
9	FW	Nguyễn Tiến Linh^{OA}	20 October 1997 (age 28)	(Vietnam Football Federation) Becamex Bình Dương
10	MF	Lý Công Hoàng Anh	1 December 1999 (age 26)	(Vietnam Football Federation) Topenland Bình Định
11	FW	Nguyễn Văn Tùng	2 June 2001 (age 24)	(Vietnam Football Federation) Hà Nội
12	DF	Phan Tuấn Tài	7 January 2001 (age 25)	(Vietnam Football Federation) Đắk Lắk
13	MF	Nguyễn Trọng Long	6 January 2000 (age 26)	(Vietnam Football Federation) Hồ Chí Minh City
14	MF	Nguyễn Hoàng Đức^{OA}	11 January 1998 (age 28)	(Vietnam Football Federation) Viettel
15	MF	Huỳnh Công Đến	19 August 2001 (age 24)	(Vietnam Football Federation) Phố Hiến
16	MF	Đỗ Hùng Dũng^{OA} (captain)	8 September 1993 (age 32)	(Vietnam Football Federation) Hà Nội
17	DF	Nhâm Mạnh Dũng	12 April 2000 (age 26)	(Vietnam Football Federation) Viettel
18	GK	Nguyễn Văn Toản	26 November 1999 (age 26)	(Vietnam Football Federation) Hải Phòng
19	FW	Hồ Thanh Minh	7 February 2000 (age 26)	(Vietnam Football Federation) Huế
20	DF	Bùi Hoàng Việt Anh	1 January 1999 (age 27)	(Vietnam Football Federation) Hà Nội

Notes

^{OA} Over-aged player

==== Group A ====
Pos	Team	Pld	W	D	L	GF	GA	GD	Pts	Qualification
1	Vietnam (H)	2	1	1	0	3	0	+3	4	Advance to Semi-finals
2	Indonesia	2	1	0	1	4	4	0	3	Advance to Semi-finals
3	Myanmar	2	2	0	0	6	4	+2	6	
4	Philippines	3	1	1	1	6	3	+3	4	
5	Timor-Leste	3	0	0	3	3	11	−8	0	

Updated to match(es) played on 8 May 2022. Source: FIFA
(H) Hosts
6 May 2022
19:00

Vietnam	3–0	Indonesia
Nguyễn Tiến Linh 54'; Đỗ Hùng Dũng 74'; Lê Văn Đô 87'	Report

Việt Trì Stadium, Phú Thọ
Attendance: 16,188
Referee: Choi Hyun-jai (South Korea)
8 May 2022
19:00

Vietnam	0–0	Philippines
	Report

Việt Trì Stadium, Phú Thọ
Attendance: ...
Referee: Feras Taweel (Syria)
13 May 2022
19:00

Myanmar	0-1	Vietnam

Việt Trì Stadium, Phú Thọ
15 May 2022
19:00

Timor-Leste	0-2	Vietnam

Việt Trì Stadium, Phú Thọ

== Gymnastics ==
=== Artistic gymnastics ===
Men

Athlete	Event	Qualification		Final	
Athlete	Event	Total	Rank	Total	Rank
Đặng Ngọc Xuân Thiện; Văn Vĩ Lương; Trịnh Hải Khang; Nguyễn Văn Khánh Phong; Đinh Phương Thành; Lê Thanh Tùng	Team	—N/a		331.25	1st place, gold medalist(s)
Lê Thanh Tùng	Individual all-around	—N/a		84.050	2nd place, silver medalist(s)
Đinh Phương Thành	Individual all-around	—N/a		82.450	3rd place, bronze medalist(s)
Trịnh Hải Khang	Floor Exercise			14.000	3rd place, bronze medalist(s)
Lê Thanh Tùng	Floor Exercise			13.433	6
Đặng Ngọc Xuân Thiện	Pommel Horse			14.400	1st place, gold medalist(s)
Đinh Phương Thành	Pommel Horse			12.067	4
Nguyễn Văn Khánh Phong	Rings			13.800	2nd place, silver medalist(s)
Lê Thanh Tùng	Rings			13.500	3rd place, bronze medalist(s)
Lê Thanh Tùng	Vault			13.950	4
Đinh Phương Thành	Parallel Bars			15.133	1st place, gold medalist(s)
Lê Thanh Tùng	Parallel Bars			14.500	3rd place, bronze medalist(s)
Đinh Phương Thành	Horizontal Bar			13.867	1st place, gold medalist(s)
Lê Thanh Tùng	Horizontal Bar			13.433	3rd place, bronze medalist(s)

Women

Athlete	Event	Qualification		Final	
Athlete	Event	Total	Rank	Total	Rank
Đỗ Thị Ngọc Hương; Trương Khánh Vân; Phạm Như Phương; Nguyễn Thị Quỳnh Như; Lâm Như Quỳnh; Trần Đoàn Quỳnh Nam	Team	—N/a		183.800	2nd place, silver medalist(s)
Phạm Như Phương	Individual all-around	—N/a		46.550	5
Trần Đoàn Quỳnh Nam	Individual all-around	—N/a		44.850	
Nguyễn Thị Quỳnh Như	Vault			13.033	2nd place, silver medalist(s)
Phạm Như Phương	Uneven Bars			12.467	2nd place, silver medalist(s)
Đỗ Thị Ngọc Hương	Uneven Bars			10.567	7
Phạm Như Phương	Balance Beam			12.167	3rd place, bronze medalist(s)
Phạm Như Phương	Floor Exercise			12.033	3rd place, bronze medalist(s)
Trương Khánh Vân	Floor Exercise			12.000	4

== Handball ==
=== Beach handball ===
Team	Event	Group Stage						
Team	Event	Opposition Score	Opposition Score	Opposition Score	Opposition Score	Opposition Score	Opposition Score	Rank
Vietnam men's	Men's tournament	Singapore; W 2–0	Philippines; W 2–0	Thailand; W 2–1	Singapore; W 2–0	Philippines; W 2–1	Thailand; W 2–1	1st place, gold medalist(s)

== Kickboxing ==
Men

Athlete	Event	Quarterfinal	Semifinal	Final	Final
Athlete	Event	Opposition Score	Opposition Score	Opposition Score	Rank
Huỳnh Văn Tuấn	Full Contact -51kg	K Khamsathone (LAO); W 3–0			
Nguyễn Quang Huy	Full Contact -60kg	C Vannthong (CAM); W 3–0			
Nguyễn Thế Hưởng	Full Contact -67kg	C. A. Nehyeban (PHI); W 3–0			
Nguyễn Xuân Phương	Low Kick -57kg	A Sivapan (THA); L 1–2	Did not advance		

Women

Athlete	Event	Quarterfinal	Semifinal	Final	Final
Athlete	Event	Opposition Score	Opposition Score	Opposition Score	Rank
Nguyễn Thị Hằng Nga	Full Contact -48 kg	V Teo (MAS); W 3–0			
Bùi Hải Linh	Low Kick -52 kg	N. S. Pov (CAM); W 2–1			
