= Triathlon at the 2021 SEA Games =

- Venue: Tuần Châu
- Location: Quảng Ninh, Vietnam
- Dates: 14–15 May 2022

Triathlon and duathlon competitions at the 2021 SEA Games took place in Tuần Châu, Quảng Ninh, Vietnam from 14 to 15 May 2022.

== Medal table ==
* Host nation (Vietnam)

Rank	Nation	Gold	Silver	Bronze	Total
1	Philippines	3	1	1	5
2	Vietnam*	1	0	0	1
3	Indonesia	0	2	3	5
4	Malaysia	0	1	0	1
Totals (4 entries)		4	4	4	12

== Medalists ==
=== Triathlon ===
Event	Gold	Silver	Bronze
Men's individual	Fernando Jose Casares; Philippines	Andrew Kim Remolino; Philippines	Ronald Setiawan Bintang; Indonesia
Women's individual	Kim Mangrobang; Philippines	Inge Prasetyo; Indonesia	Raven Faith Alcoseba; Philippines

=== Duathlon ===
Event	Gold	Silver	Bronze
Men's individual	Phạm Tiến Sản; Vietnam	Rudi Febriade; Indonesia	Jauhari Johan; Indonesia
Women's individual	Kim Mangrobang; Philippines	Tahira Najmunisaa Muhammad Zaid; Malaysia	Zahra Putri Bulan Aprillia; Indonesia
