= Kim Mangrobang =

Filipina triathlete (born 1991)

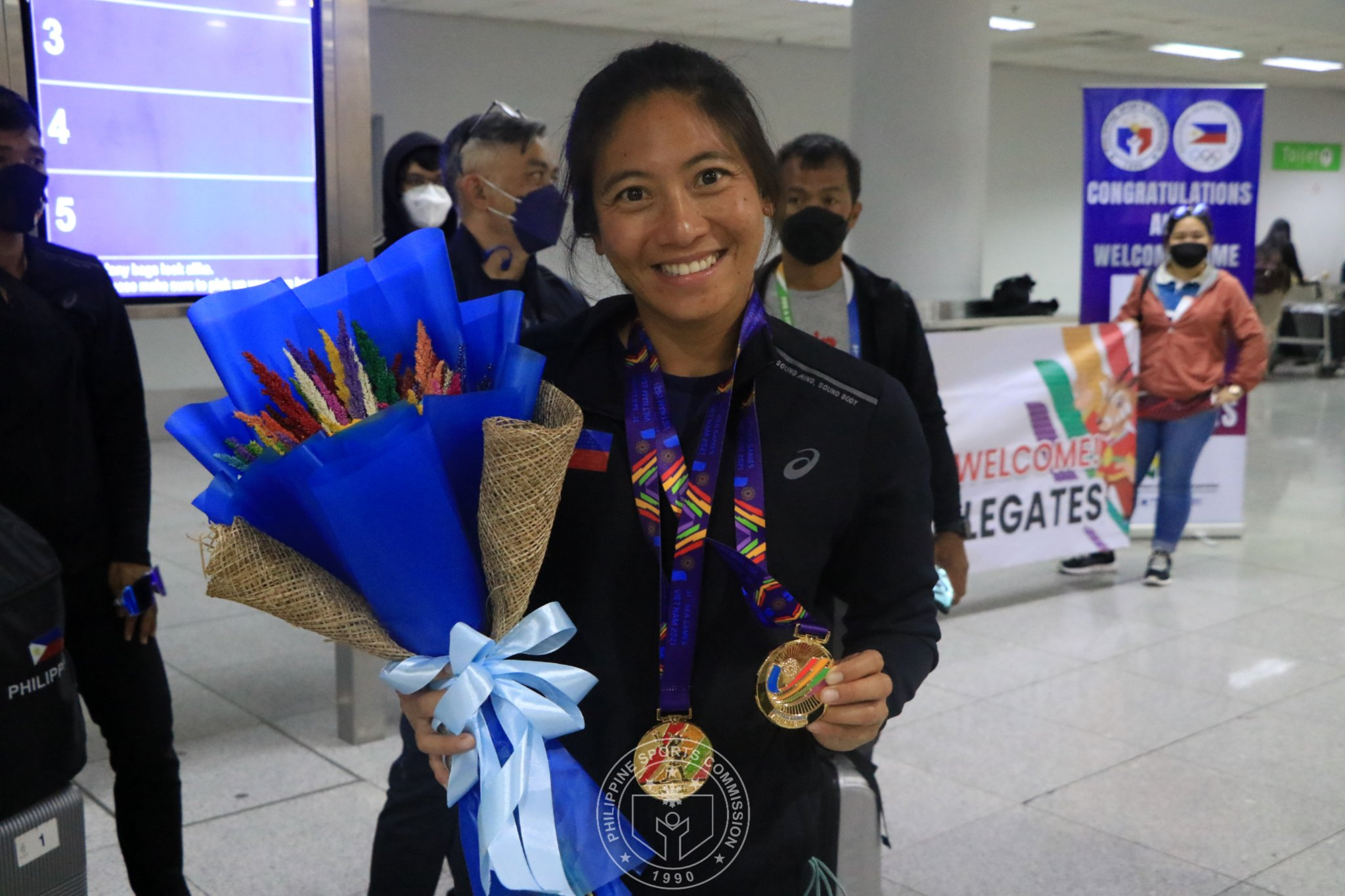
- Mangrobang with her medals from the 2021 Southeast Asian Games

Personal information
- Full name: Marion Kim Mangrobang
- Born: September 4, 1991 (age 35) Manila, Philippines

Sport
- Country: Philippines
- Coached by: Sergio Santos
Medal record
Event	1st	2nd	3rd
Southeast Asian Games	7	3	0
Total	7	3	0
Representing Philippines
Women's triathlon
Southeast Asian Games
Gold medal – first place	2025 Thailand	Women’s Team Relay
Gold medal – first place	2021 Vietnam	Individual
Gold medal – first place	2019 Philippines	Individual
Gold medal – first place	2019 Philippines	Mixed Relay
Gold medal – first place	2017 Putrajaya	Individual
Silver medal – second place	2025 Thailand	Mixed Relay
Silver medal – second place	2023 Cambodia	Individual
Silver medal – second place	2015 Singapore	Individual
Women's duathlon
Asian Championships
Bronze medal – third place	2025 Manama	Individual
Southeast Asian Games
Gold medal – first place	2023 Cambodia	Individual
Gold medal – first place	2021 Vietnam	Individual

Marion Kim Mangrobang (born September 4, 1991) is a Filipino professional triathlete. Mangrobang is a gold medalist in the Southeast Asian Games women's and mixed relay triathlon events.

== Early life ==
As early as nine years old, she has shown interest in sports and was encouraged by her parents. In 2000, she took swimming lessons. Competing in a variety of sports events—from weekly fun runs to both local and international competitions—Mangrobang pursued competitive training in 2014, supported by her Portuguese coach, Sergio Santos.

== Education ==
Mangrobang attended the Dominican College of Sta. Rosa, Laguna.

== Triathlon career ==
Mangrobang won her third gold medal at the 30th Southeast Asian (SEA) Games women's triathlon at the Subic Bay Boardwalk in Zambales.
