= Malaysia at the 2021 SEA Games =

Malaysia at the 2021 Southeast Asian Games
- IOC code: MAS
- NOC: Olympic Council of Malaysia
- Website: www.olympic.org.my (in English)

in Hanoi, Vietnam
- Competitors: 584 in 37 sports
- Flag bearer: Nur Dhabitah Sabri (diving)
- Officials: 217
- Medals Ranked 6th: Gold 39 Silver 45 Bronze 90 Total 174

Southeast Asian Games appearances (overview)
- 1959; 1961; 1965; 1967; 1969; 1971; 1973; 1975; 1977; 1979; 1981; 1983; 1985; 1987; 1989; 1991; 1993; 1995; 1997; 1999; 2001; 2003; 2005; 2007; 2009; 2011; 2013; 2015; 2017; 2019; 2021; 2023; 2025; 2027; 2029

Malaysia participated in the 2021 Southeast Asian Games in Hanoi, Vietnam from 12 to 23 May 2022. The Malaysian contingent consisted of 584 athletes, competing in 37 out 40 sports (all except Handball, Vovinam and Wrestling), 58 percent of which are debutants.

== Background ==
=== Preparations ===
Datuk Haji Hamidin Haji Mohd Amin, President of the Football Association of Malaysia (FAM) was initially appointed as the delegation's Chef de Mission on 9 March 2021. However, he resigned to focus on his responsibilities as deputy president of Olympic Council of Malaysia (OCM), and was replaced by Malaysian Karate Federation (MAKAF) secretary-general, Datuk Paduka Nur Azmi Ahmad for the position on 14 September 2021.

On 29 December 2021, the OCM Selection Committee under the Chairmanship of OCM President Tan Sri Dato’ Sri Norza Zakaria held a meeting to discuss the selection criteria for the 2021 Southeast Asian Games and decided that:

- For individual sports, athletes must be at least in the top three of their respective events to qualify as Category A, and top six as Category B (reduced from top eight due to tightened criteria);
- For team sports, a team needs to be in top four to be considered under Category A;
- The committee will utilise competitions from 2018 to February 2022 as basis for selection; And,
- The deadline for entry by name will be on 12 March 2022.

On 23 April 2022, the OCM announced diver Nur Dhabitah Sabri to be the flag bearer at the Opening Ceremony and unveiled a new set of apparel for the national delegation sponsored by Yonex-Sunrise and made from TruVapor, a type of multi-groove micropolyester fibre which absorbs and dispels sweat quickly; subsequently lowering body temperature.

During the flag handover ceremony at Bukit Jalil, Kuala Lumpur on 27 April 2022, Malaysian Youth and Sports Minister Ahmad Faizal Azumu announced the 146-medal target for the delegation, which consists of 36 gold, 35 silver and 75 bronze medals. Several factors were taken into consideration when setting the target, such as the lack of events which the national delegation is capable of winning medals, as well as the constraints due to the COVID-19 pandemic, which resulted in the postponement and cancellation of many tournaments worldwide.

=== Broadcasters ===
Name	Type	Ref
Astro	Pay and over-the-top	
RTM	Free-to-air and over-the-top	

== Medal summary ==
=== Medal by sport ===
Medals by sport
Sport	1st place, gold medalist(s)	2nd place, silver medalist(s)	3rd place, bronze medalist(s)	Total
Archery	2	2	5	9
Athletics	5	3	8	16
Badminton	1	2	1	4
Basketball	0	0	1	1
Bodybuilding	1	3	4	8
Bowling	0	2	1	3
Boxing	0	0	3	3
Billiards	1	1	1	3
Chess	0	0	2	2
Cycling	2	3	3	9
Dancesport	0	0	1	1
Diving	8	3	1	12
Duathlon	0	1	0	1
Esports	0	0	3	3
Fencing	0	1	3	4
Futsal	0	0	1	1
Golf	2	1	1	4
Gymnastics	4	2	2	8
Judo	0	0	2	2
Jujitsu	0	1	1	2
Karate	4	0	6	10
Kickboxing	0	0	5	5
Kurash	0	0	3	3
Muay Thai	1	1	0	2
Pencak silat	2	3	9	14
Petanque	0	1	2	3
Sepak Takraw	0	3	2	5
Shooting	2	2	0	3
Swimming	1	4	2	7
Taekwondo	1	1	3	5
Table tennis	0	1	4	5
Tennis	0	0	2	2
Weightlifting	0	1	3	4
Wushu	2	1	2	5
Xiangqi	0	2	3	5
Total	39	45	90	174

=== Medal by date ===
Medals by date
Day	Date	1st place, gold medalist(s)	2nd place, silver medalist(s)	3rd place, bronze medalist(s)	Total
-4	8 May	2	1	0	3
-3	9 May	2	0	1	4
-2	10 May	2	1	7	10
-1	11 May	3	1	3	7
1	13 May	2	2	2	6
2	14 May	2	3	11	16
3	15 May	3	6	14	23
4	16 May	3	10	7	20
5	17 May	4	2	9	15
6	18 May	4	6	8	18
7	19 May	7	6	12	25
8	20 May	2	2	9	13
9	21 May	1	0	3	4
10	22 May	2	5	4	11
Total		39	45	90	174

=== Medalists ===
Medal	Name	Sport	Event	Date
Gold	Nur Dhabitah Sabri	Diving	Women's 1m springboard	8 May
Gold	Tze Liang Ooi; Yiwei Chew	Diving	Men's synchronized 3m springboard	8 May
Gold	Tze Liang Ooi	Diving	Men's 1m springboard	9 May
Gold	Ker Ying Ong; Yan Yee Ng	Diving	Women's synchronized 3m springboard	9 May
Gold	Yan Yee Ng	Diving	Women's 3m springboard	10 May
Gold	Hanis Nazirul Jaya Surya; Jellson Jabillin	Diving	Men's synchronized 10m platform	10 May
Gold	Muhammad Syafiq Puteh	Diving	Men's 3m springboard	11 May
Gold	Pandelela Rinong Pamg; Nur Dhabitah Sabri	Diving	Women's synchronized 10m platform	11 May
Gold	Sazzlan Yuga; Mohd Taqiyuddin Hamid	Pencak Silat	Men's seni ganda	11 May
Gold	Clement Ting Su Wei	Wushu	Men's taolu changquan	13 May
Gold	Tan Zhi Yan	Wushu	Men's taolu taijiquan	13 May
Gold	Jackie Wong Siew Cheer	Athletics	Men's hammer throw	14 May
Gold	Grace Wong Xiu Mei	Athletics	Women's hammer throw	14 May
Gold	Mohd Syarul Azman Mahen Abdullah	Bodybuilding	Men's athletic physique	15 May
Gold	Ervin Chang	Golf	Men's individual	15 May
Gold	Rachel Li Wen Yeoh	Gymnastics	Women's artistic uneven bars	15 May
Gold	Nor Sarah Adi	Athletics	Women's pole vault	16 May
Gold	Rachel Li Wen Yeoh	Gymnastics	Women's artistic balance beam	16 May
Gold	Muhammad Khairi Adib Azhar	Pencak Silat	Men's tanding class B	16 May
Gold	Andre Anura Anuar	Athletics	Men's triple jump	17 May
Gold	Muhammad Irfan Shamsuddin	Athletics	Men's discus throw	17 May
Gold	Kok Leong Lim	Billiards	Men's snooker 6-red singles	17 May
Gold	Nur Assyira Zainal Abiding; Natahsya Soon; Ahmad Syazrin Awang Ilah; Zulfikri Zulkifli	Cycling	Mixed mountain bike cross-country relay	17 May
Gold	Ervin Chang; Rhaasrikanesh Kanavathi; Marcus Lim Pang Chuen	Golf	Men's team	18 May
Gold	Sankar Sureeya Sankar Hari	Karate	Men's 67kg kumite	18 May
Gold	Shahmalarani Chandran	Karate	Women's 50kg kumite	18 May
Gold	Khiew Hoe Yean	Swimming	Men's 200m freestyle	18 May
Gold	Mohd Juwaidi Mazuki	Archery	Men's individual compound	19 May
Gold	Mohd Juwaidi Mazuki; Fatin Nurfatehah Mat Salleh	Archery	Mixed compound team	19 May
Gold	Koi Sie Yan	Gymnastics	Rhythmic individual all-around	19 May
Gold	Shak Yuki; Jingle Shak Qi; Maia Xiao Han Ong; Ashley Xin Yi Lim; Yi Tung Yap	Gymnastics	Rhythmic group all-around	19 May
Gold	Sharmendran Raghonathan	Karate	Men's 75kg kumite	19 May
Gold	Jonathan Wong Guan Jie	Shooting	Men's 10m air pistol	19 May
Gold	Muhammad Syafiq Zuber	Taekwondo	Men's kyorugi welterweight 80 kg	19 May
Gold	Sharmendran Raghonathan; Prem Kumar Selvam; Sankar Sureeya Sankar Hari	Karate	Men's team kumite	20 May
Gold	Nurul Syasya Nadiah Mohd Ariffin	Shooting	Women's 10m air pistol	20 May
Gold	Nur Aiman Mohd Zariff	Cycling	Men's road race	21 May
Gold	Chen Tang Jie; Peck Yen Wei	Badminton	Mixed doubles	22 May
Gold	Ahmad Nor Iman	Muay Thai	Men's Combat 54kg	22 May
Silver	Kimberly Qian Ping Bong	Diving	Women's 1m springboard	8 May
Silver	Ker Ying Ong	Diving	Women's 3m springboard	10 May
Silver	Gabriel Gilbert Daim	Diving	Men's 3m springboard	11 May
Silver	Azri Asmat Sefri	Bodybuilding	Men's -55kg	13 May
Silver	Calvin Lee Wai Leong	Wushu	Men's taolu nandao	13 May
Silver	Buda Anchah	Bodybuilding	Men's -70kg	14 May
Silver	Zmarul Al Adam Pulutan Abdullah	Bodybuilding	Men's -75kg	14 May
Silver	Sim Yip How; Yeoh Thean Jern	Xiangqi	Men's rapid team	14 May
Silver	Tahira Najmunisaa Muhammad Zaid	Duathlon	Women's individual	15 May
Silver	Tan Fu Jie	Gymnastics	Men's artistic pommel horse	15 May
Silver	Adam Akasyah	Jujitsu	Men's -69kg	15 May
Silver	Sharifah Aqilah Farhana Syed Ali; Nurashimah Senin	Petanque	Women's doubles	15 May
Silver	Zuhri Zain; Zarif Marican Ibrahim Marican; Aidil Aiman Azwawi; Afifuddin Razali; Faisal Fuad; Norfaizzul Abd Razak; Noraizat Nordin; Haziq Hairul Nizam; Redwan Hakim; Zulhasni Basri; Eqbal Shamsudin; Asyraaf Hadi	Sepak Takraw	Men's team Regu	15 May
Silver	Leong Chee Feng; Wong Qi Shen; Choong Javen	Table tennis	Men's team	15 May
Silver	Queenie Ting Kung Ni	Athletics	Women's discus throw	16 May
Silver	Jonathan Nyepa; Muhammad Haiqal Hanafi; Muhammad Azeem Mohd Fahmi; Muhammad Zulfiqar Ismail; Muhammad Arsyad Md Saat	Athletics	Men's 4 × 100 m relay	16 May
Silver	Nur Assyira Zainal Abidin	Cycling	Women's mountain bike cross-country	16 May
Silver	Siti Shazwana Ajak	Pencak Silat	Women's tanding class E	16 May
Silver	Siti Rahmah Mohamed Nasir	Pencak Silat	Women's tanding class F	16 May
Silver	Billage Anak Nakang	Pencak Silat	Men's tanding free class	16 May
Silver	Hafiz Adzha	Shooting	Men's 25m rapid-fire pistol	16 May
Silver	Khiew Hoe Yean	Swimming	Men's 400m freestyle	16 May
Silver	Khiew Hoe Yean	Swimming	Men's 200m backstroke	16 May
Silver	Jason Loo Jun Wei	Taekwondo	Men's poomsae individual recognized	16 May
Silver	Zarif Marican Ibrahim Marican; Faisal Fuad; Afifuddin Razali; Noraizat Nordin; Norfaizzul Abd Razak	Sepak Takraw	Men's regu	17 May
Silver	Lim Yin Chuen; Welson Sim; Khiew Hoe Yean; Arvin Shaun Singh Chalal	Swimming	Men's 4 × 200 m freestyle relay	17 May
Silver	Khairul Anuar Mohamad; Syaqiera Mashayikh	Archery	Mixed recurve team	18 May
Silver	Nauraj Singh Randhawa	Athletics	Men's high jump	18 May
Silver	Hans Yoong Wei Shen; Cheng Xin Han; Chong Hong Li; Kaerlan Vinod Kamalanathan	Fencing	Men's foil team	18 May
Silver	Kok Jing Hong; Lee Shun Yang; Shahyar Shaqeem; Justin Hoh; Man Wei Chong; Tee Kai Wun; Junaidi Arif; Muhammad Haikal; Hoo Pang Ron; Chen Tang Jie	Badminton	Men's team	18 May
Silver	Jeneath Wong; Mirabel Ting Ern Hui	Golf	Women's team	18 May
Silver	Alia Sazana Azahari	Shooting	Women's 25m sport pistol	18 May
Silver	Mohd Juwaidi Mazuki; Wong Co Wan; Alang Ariff Aqil Muhammad Ghazali	Archery	Men's compound Team	19 May
Silver	Shahrukh Amin Zulkifli; Nevern Netaneel Marcellinus; Muhammad Hafiz Zainuddin; Muhammad Syarizol Shamsudin	Bowling	Men's team of four	19 May
Silver	Nur Syazwani Sahar; Gillian Lim Siew Giok; Nerosha Keligit Thiagarajan; Nora Lyana Nastasia	Bowling	Women's team of four	19 May
Silver	Ng Joe Ee	Gymnastics	Rhythmic individual all-around	19 May
Silver	Afifuddin Razali; Noraizat Nordin; Aidil Aiman Azwawi	Sepak Takraw	Men's doubles	19 May
Silver	Phee Jinq En	Swimming	Women's 100m breaststroke	19 May
Silver	Jee Xin Ru	Xiangqi	Women's standard single	20 May
Silver	Aznil Bidin	Weightlifting	Men's 61kg	20 May
Silver	Nur Aisyah Mohamad Zubir	Cycling	Women's road race	22 May
Silver	Kate Yasmin Velasco; Maritoni Krog Lucas; Jermyn Pardillo Prado; Marianne Grace Dacumos Aromin	Cycling	Women's road team	22 May
Silver	Hoo Pang Ron; Cheah Yee See	Badminton	Mixed doubles	22 May
Silver	Kok Leong Lim	Billiards	Men's snooker singles	22 May
Silver	Nur Amisha Azrilrizal	Muay Thai	Women's combat 51kg	22 May
Bronze	Bertrand Rhodict Lises	Diving	Men's 1m springboard	9 May
Bronze	Wei Sheng Seaw	Kickboxing	Men's full contact -57kg	10 May
Bronze	Athachai Saiprawat	Kickboxing	Men's full contact -67kg	10 May
Bronze	Awangku Abdul Rahman	Kickboxing	Men's low kick -54kg	10 May
Bronze	Mohammad Ezzat Mohd Noor	Kurash	Men's -90kg	10 May
Bronze	Luqman Laji	Pencak Silat	Men's seni tunggal	10 May
Bronze	Nur Syazreena Malik; Nor Hamizah Abu Hassan	Pencak Silat	Women's seni ganda	10 May
Bronze	Merrywati Manuil; Siti Nur Khairunnisa Hail; Fatin Ardani Zamri	Pencak Silat	Women's seni regu	10 May
Bronze	Mohammad Rifdean Masdor	Kickboxing	Men's full contact -51kg	11 May
Bronze	Hayatun Najihin Radzuan	Kickboxing	Women's low kick -60kg	11 May
Bronze	Yousuff Daniel Fauzi Cruz	Kurash	Men's -66kg	11 May
Bronze	Malvern Abdullah	Bodybuilding	Men's -65kg	13 May
Bronze	Mohamad Razlan Rozaidi	Kurash	Men's -73kg	13 May
Bronze	Iskandar Alwi	Athletics	Men's pole vault	14 May
Bronze	Sadat Marzuqi Ajisan	Athletics	Men's hammer throw	14 May
Bronze	Zainal Arif Zainal Ariffin	Bodybuilding	Men's -80kg	14 May
Bronze	Muhammad Uzair Mat Noor	Bodybuilding	Men's -85kg	14 May
Bronze	Koh I Jie	Fencing	Men's épée individual	14 May
Bronze	Rachel Li Wen Yeoh	Gymnastics	Women's artistic individual all-around	14 May
Bronze	Khoon Yin Bless Yeap	Jujitsu	Women's -48kg	14 May
Bronze	Mohamad Hazim Amzad	Pencak Silat	Men's tanding class C	14 May
Bronze	Ying Ho; Karen Lyne Anak Dick; Alice Li Sian Chang	Table tennis	Women's team	14 May
Bronze	Syed Mohd Agil Syed Naguib; Hao Sheng Koay; Imran Daniel Abd Hazli; Muhammad Aiman Hamdan	Tennis	Men's team	14 May
Bronze	Sydney Chin Sy Xuan	Wushu	Women's taolu taijiquan	14 May
Bronze	Muhammad Ziyad Zukefli	Athletics	Men's shot put	15 May
Bronze	Malvern Abdullah; Shelen Aderina Kok Gong Tai	Bodybuilding	Mixed pairs	15 May
Bronze	Darren Gan; Luqman Haziq; Asyraf Kamal; Gan Mun Kiat; Hakimm Narizan	ESports	PC FIFA online 4	15 May
Bronze	Hans Wei Shen Yoong	Fencing	Men's foil individual	15 May
Bronze	Jeneath Wong	Golf	Women's individual	15 May
Bronze	Muhammad Sharul Aimy	Gymnastics	Men's artistic pommel horse	15 May
Bronze	Ahmad Atif Irsyad	Pencak Silat	Men's tanding class D	15 May
Bronze	Mohd Al-Jufferi Jamari	Pencak Silat	Men's tanding class F	15 May
Bronze	Mohd Fauzi Khalid	Pencak Silat	Men's tanding class G	15 May
Bronze	Mohammad Amiruddin Adzmi	Pencak Silat	Men's tanding class H	15 May
Bronze	Muhammad Robial Sobri	Pencak Silat	Men's tanding class J	15 May
Bronze	Siti Nor Zubaidah Che Abd Wahab; Siti Nor Suhaida Jafri; Nur Fatihah Azizul; Nur Natasha Amira Fazil; Nor Azira Suhaimi; Razman Anam; Nadillatul Rosmahani Saidin; Nurul Izzatul Hikmah Md Zulkifli; Kamisah Khamis; Nur Fateha Rossli; Nur Asmida Rambli; Siti Farisha Ismi Hissan	Sepak Takraw	Women's team regu	15 May
Bronze	Yeap Wai Kin	Wushu	Men's taolu daoshu + gunshu	15 May
Bronze	Fang Sze Jie; Yeoh Thean Jern	Xiangqi	Men's blitz team	15 May
Bronze	Savinder Kaur Jogindr Singh	Athletics	Women's 800m	16 May
Bronze	Nor Sarah Adi; Siti Fatimah Mohamad; Komalam Shally Selvaretnam; Zaidatul Husniah Zulkifli; Azreen Nabila Alias	Athletics	Women's 4 × 100 m relay	16 May
Bronze	Choo Kang Ni	Athletics	Women's discus throw	16 May
Bronze	Keen Hoo Moh	Billiards	Men's snooker 6-red singles	16 May
Bronze	Natahsya Soon	Cycling	Women's mountain bike cross-country	16 May
Bronze	Leonard Hoh Jie Ren; Mu Ning Huan	Dancesport	Standard slow foxtrot	16 May
Bronze	Jia Wei Lim; Nur Humaira Abdul Karim; Nurul Hidayah Abdul Karim	Taekwondo	Women's poomsae team recognized	16 May
Bronze	Norliyana Kamaruddin	Athletics	Women's heptathlon	17 May
Bronze	Nur Syazwani Sahar; Gillian Lim Siew Giok	Bowling	Women's double	17 May
Bronze	Jia Ru Sim	Chess	Women's individual rapid	17 May
Bronze	I Jie Koh; Mohammad Roslan Mohamed; Isaac Seet Kai Xuan; Kelvyn Mancheng Kok	Fencing	Men's épée team	17 May
Bronze	Syed Afiq Fakhri Syed Ali; Sharifah Aqilah Farhanan Syed Ali	Petanque	Mixed double	17 May
Bronze	Siti Nor Zubaidah Che Abd Wahab; Siti Nor Suhaida Jafri; Kamisah Khamis; Nur Asmida Rambli; Razman Anam	Sepak Takraw	Women's regu	17 May
Bronze	Job Tan Xi Jay	Swimming	Men's 200m breaststroke	17 May
Bronze	Chung Wan Sebastian Tan	Taekwondo	Men's kyorugi -54kg	17 May
Bronze	Ahmad Nor Iman Hakim Rakib	Taekwondo	Men's kyorugi -68kg	17 May
Bronze	Khairul Anuar Mohamad	Archery	Men's recurve individual	18 May
Bronze	Syaqiera Mashayikh	Archery	Women's recurve individual	18 May
Bronze	Mohamad Eizlan Dahalan	Athletics	Men's high jump	18 May
Bronze	Bryan Ting Liew Luing; Khairul Anuar Mohamad; Muhamad Zarif Syahiir Zolkepeli	Archery	Men's recurve team	18 May
Bronze	Asmadie Muhammad Aiqal	Karate	Men's individual kata	18 May
Bronze	Prem Kumar Selvam	Karate	Men's 60kg kumite	18 May
Bronze	Javen Choong; Wong Qi Shen	Table tennis	Men's doubles	18 May
Bronze	Ho Ying; Karen Lyne Anak Dick	Table tennis	Women's doubles	18 May
Bronze	Alang Arif Aqil Muhammad Ghazali	Archery	Men's individual compound	19 May
Bronze	Fatin Nurfatehah Mat Salleh; Iman Aisyah Norazam; Kayalvhily	Archery	Women's compound Team	19 May
Bronze	Mohamad Akram Rashid	Boxing	Men's Lightweight 63kg	19 May
Bronze	Nur Aisyah Mohamad Zubir	Cycling	Women's Road Criterium	19 May
Bronze	Sity Norazizah; Hanis Farhana Shamsul Azizan; Intan Sarah Anisah Zulgafli; Siti Asnidah Zamri; Nur Hanani Adriana; Nur Syafiqah Zainal Abidin; Nur Lyana Soberi; Nur Ainsyah Binti Murad; Noorasyeimah Mohamad Rashid; Norhawa Md Yasin; Fatin Shahida; Nur Shazreen Munazli; Shereilynn Elly Pius; Usliza Usman; Masturah Majid; Haindee Mosroh	Futsal	Women's team	19 May
Bronze	Amir Daniel Abdul Majeed	Judo	Men's 73kg	19 May
Bronze	Kamini Sri Segaran	Judo	Women's 57kg	19 May
Bronze	Khaw Yee Voon; Sin Yi Chang; Lim Hui Ling	Karate	Women's team kata	19 May
Bronze	Ayzek Hakimi Safingan; Muhammad Arif Kanai; Mohamad Syazwan Sani	Petanque	Men's triples	19 May
Bronze	Khiew Hoe Yean	Swimming	Men's 800 Metre Freestyle	19 May
Bronze	Mohamad Aniq Kasdan	Weightlifting	Men's 55kg	19 May
Bronze	Amirah Syahirah Azlan	Karate	Women's 68kg Kumite	19 May
Bronze	Khir Akyazlan Azmi	Boxing	Men's Light heavyweight 81kg	20 May
Bronze	Mohamed Aswan Che Azmi	Boxing	Men's welterweight 69kg	20 May
Bronze	Nur Aiman Rosli	Cycling	Men's road time trial	20 May
Bronze	Ivan Oh; Emmanuel Leong; Thomson Hoe	Karate	Men's team kata	20 May
Bronze	Preyancli Santhiran; Siti Nur Azwani Nor Azli; Mathivani Murugeesan; Madhuri Poovanesan	Karate	Women's team kumite	20 May
Bronze	Ho Ying	Table tennis	Women's singles	20 May
Bronze	Jawairiah Noordin; Sharifah Elysia Wan Abdul Rahman	Tennis	Women's doubles	20 May
Bronze	Fang Sze Jie	Xiangqi	Men's Standard Single	20 May
Bronze	Tan Yu Huat	Xiangqi	Men's Standard Single	20 May
Bronze	Cheah Yee See; Cheng Su Hui	Badminton	Women's doubles	21 May
Bronze	Puteri Rifqah Fahada Azhar; Puteri Munajjah Az-Zahraa Azhar	Chess	Women's Blitz Team	21 May
Bronze	Muhammad Erry Hidayat	Weightlifting	Men's 73kg	21 May May
Bronze	Magdelene Low Phey Chyi; Nur Izzati Yaakob; Kalaimathi Rajintiran; Chong Yin Yin; Lee Jo Rynn; Foo Suet Ying; Tan Sin Jie; Toh Ke Hui; Pang Hui Pin; Yap Fook Yee	Basketball	Women's 5x5	22 May
Bronze	Shee Ji Hong; Loo Yong Leong; Lai Chia Chien; Cheo Yong Chen; Cheng Wei Han	Esports	Arena of Valor	22 May
Bronze	Muhammad Izzrudin Hashim; Muhammad Farish Husaini Zailani; Muhammad Irfan Jafni Mohamad; Mohamad Amizul Hafiz Mohd Fadzli	Esports	PlayerUnknown Battlegrounds team	22 May
Bronze	Muhammad Hafiz Samsudin	Weightlifting	Men's 89kg	22 May

== Archery ==
Recurve

Athlete	Event	Qualification Round		Round of 1/8		Round of 1/4		Round of 1/2		Final / BM	
Athlete	Event	Opposition Score	Seed	Opposition Score	Rank	Opposition Score	Rank	Opposition Score	Rank	Opposition Score	Rank
Muhamad Zarif Syahiir Zolkepeli	Men's individual	625	19	did not advance							
Khairul Anuar Mohamad	Men's individual	652	5	6	=1	6	2	2	4	N Văn Linh (VIE); W 6–4	3rd place, bronze medalist(s)
Mohamad Firdaus Mohd Rusmadi	Men's individual	640	10	did not advance							
Bryson Ting Tiew Luing Ting	Men's individual	651	7	6	=1	3	5	did not advance			
Syaqiera Mashayikh	Women's individual	628	4	6	=2	6	=2	0	4	P Jongkraijak (THA); W 6–5	3rd place, bronze medalist(s)
Nuramalia Haneesha Mazlan	Women's individual	600	13	4	7	did not advance					
Nur Ain Ayuni Fozi	Women's individual	587	16	did not advance							
Nurul Azreena Mohamad Fazil	Women's individual	517	20	did not advance							
Bryson Ting Tiew Luing Ting; Khairul Anuar Mohamad; Muhamad Zarif Syahiir Zolkepeli	Men's team	—N/a				6	=1	4	=3	Philippines (PHI); W 6–2	3rd place, bronze medalist(s)
Nur Ain Ayuni Fozi; Nuramalia Haneesha Mazlan; Syaqiera Mashayikh	Women's team	—N/a				Bye	-	2	4	Myanmar (MYA); L 4–5	4
Khairul Anuar Mohamad; Syaqiera Mashayikh	Mixed Team	—N/a				6	=1	5	=1	Indonesia (INA); L 2–6	2nd place, silver medalist(s)

Compound

Athlete	Event	Qualification Round		Round of 8		Round of 1/4		Round of 1/2		Final / BM	
Athlete	Event	Opposition Score	Rank	Opposition Score	Rank	Opposition Score	Rank	Opposition Score	Rank	Opposition Score	Rank
Alang Arif Aqil Muhammad Ghazali	Men's individual	696	4	139	5	142	4	140	3	N Văn Đầy (VIE); W 146–143	3rd place, bronze medalist(s)
Wong Co Wan	Men's individual	694	8	did not advance							
Mohamad Syafiq Md Ariffin	Men's individual	680	18	did not advance							
Mohd Juwaidi Mazuki	Men's individual	702	1	Bye	-	144	1	144	1	S Chainak (THA); W 147–142	1st place, gold medalist(s)
Kayalvhily	Women's individual	674	9	136	7	did not advance					
Iman Aisyah Norazam	Women's individual	669	13	did not advance							
Fatin Nurfatehah Mat Salleh	Women's individual	685	3	Bye	-	128	8	did not advance			
Nur Aina Yasmine Halim	Women's individual	669	13	did not advance							
Mohd Juwaidi Mazuki; Wong Co Wan; Alang Arif Aqil Muhammad Ghazali	Men's team	—N/a				Bye	-	234	1	Indonesia (INA); L 229–230	2nd place, silver medalist(s)
Fatin Nurfatehah Mat Salleh; Iman Aisyah Norazam; Kayalvhily	Women's team	—N/a				Bye	-	219	3	Philippines (PHI); W 227–224	3rd place, bronze medalist(s)
Mohd Juwaidi Mazuki; Fatin Nurfatehah Mat Salleh	Mixed Team	—N/a				157	1	154	2	Philippines (PHI); W 151–150	1st place, gold medalist(s)

== Athletics ==
Men

Athlete	Event	Heats		Final	
Athlete	Event	Result	Rank	Result	Rank
Azeem Fahmi	100 m	DSQ	-	did not advance	
Arsyad Saat	100 m	10.61	3 Q	10.69	6
Arsyad Saat	200 m	21.00 s	3 Q	20.95 s	4
Jonathan Nyepa	200 m	21.25 s	3 Q	21.24 s	6
Avinashwer Austin Murugan	800 m	—N/a		1:56.97	4
Prabudass Krishnan	1500 m	—N/a		DNS	-
Prabudass Krishnan	5000 m	—N/a		DNS	-
Prabudass Krishnan	10000 m	—N/a		DNS	-
Mohd Amirul Arif Mohd Azri	1500 m	—N/a		3:56.82	4
Jonathan Nyepa; Muhammad Haiqal Hanafi; Muhammad Azeem Mohd Fahmi; Muhammad Zulfiqar Ismail; Muhammad Arsyad Md Saat	4 × 100 m relay	—N/a		39.09 s NR	2nd place, silver medalist(s)
Rayzam Shah Wan Sofian	110 m hurdles	—N/a		14.80 s	6
Mohd Rizzua Haizad Muhamad	110 m hurdles	—N/a		14.29 s	4
Muhaizar Mohamad	Marathon	—N/a		DNF	-
Jackie Wong Siew Cheer	Hammer throw	—N/a		66.49 m	1st place, gold medalist(s)
Sadat Marzuqi Ajisan	Hammer throw	—N/a		58.86 m	3rd place, bronze medalist(s)
Andre Anura Anuar	Long Jump	—N/a		7.24 m	5
Andre Anura Anuar	Triple Jump	—N/a		16.51 m	1st place, gold medalist(s)
Brendon Ting Li King	Triple Jump	—N/a		15.48 m	7
Iskandar Alwi	Pole vault	—N/a		4.80 m	3rd place, bronze medalist(s)
Farm Loong Deng	Shot Put	—N/a		16.62 m	6
Muhammad Ziyad Zolkefli	Shot Put	—N/a		17.20 m	3rd place, bronze medalist(s)
Nauraj Singh Randhawa	High jump	—N/a		2.18 m	2nd place, silver medalist(s)
Mohamad Eizlan Dahalan	High jump	—N/a		2.18 m	3rd place, bronze medalist(s)
Irfan Shamsuddin	Discus throw	—N/a		58.26 m	1st place, gold medalist(s)

Women

Athlete	Event	Heats		Final	
Athlete	Event	Result	Rank	Result	Rank
Azreen Nabila Alias	100m	12.12	4 Q	11.99	7
Zaidatul Husniah Zulkifli	100m	12.23	2 Q	12.11	8
Zaidatul Husniah Zulkifli	200 m	24.21 s	3 Q	24.07 s	4
Siti Fatimah Mohamad	200 m	25.92 s	3 Q	25.29 s	8
Savinder Kaur Jogindr Singh	800 m	—N/a		2:10.24	3rd place, bronze medalist(s)
Nor Sarah Adi; Siti Fatimah Mohamad; Komalam Shally Selvaretnam; Zaidatul Husniah Zulkifli; Azreen Nabila Alias	4 × 100 m relay	—N/a		45.32 s	3rd place, bronze medalist(s)
Nurul Ashikin Hussin	20 km race walk	—N/a		2:07:12	5
Noor Amelia Musa	Marathon	—N/a		3:19.57	6
Kirthana Ramasamy	Triple jump	—N/a		13.14 m	5
Kirthana Ramasamy	Long jump	—N/a		5.94 m	5
Grace Wong Xiu Mei	Hammer throw	—N/a		57.13 m	1st place, gold medalist(s)
Queenie Ting Kung Ni	Discus throw	—N/a		52.36 m NR	2nd place, silver medalist(s)
Queenie Ting Kung Ni	Shot Put	—N/a		11.63 m	4
Choo Kang Ni	Discus throw	—N/a		46.57 m	3rd place, bronze medalist(s)
Ngu Jia Xin	High jump	—N/a		1.65 m	5
Nor Sarah Adi	Pole vault	—N/a		4.00 m	1st place, gold medalist(s)
Norliyana Kamaruddin	Heptathlon	—N/a		5,262 NR	3rd place, bronze medalist(s)

== Badminton ==
Malaysia will be sending a total 20 badminton players, 10 players per gender.

Men

Athlete	Event	First Round	Quarterfinal	Semifinal	Final	
Athlete	Event	Opposition Score	Opposition Score	Opposition Score	Opposition Score	Rank
Kok Jing Hong	Singles	Loh K Y (SGP); L (21–18, 15–21, 11–21)	did not advance			
Lee Shun Yang	Singles	P Sokthavy (LAO); W (21–5, 21–4)	K Vitidsarn (THA); L (11–21, 11–21)	did not advance		
Man Wei Chong; Tee Kai Wun	Doubles	Đ Tuấn Đức / P Hồng Nam (VIE); L W/O	did not advance			
Junaidi Arif; Muhammad Haikal	Doubles	P Kusumawardana / Y Rambitan (INA); L (13–21, 21–17, 14–21)	did not advance			
Kok Jing Hong; Lee Shun Yang; Shahyar Shaqeem; Justin Hoh; Man Wei Chong; Tee Kai Wun; Junaidi Arif; Muhammad Haikal; Hoo Pang Ron; Chen Tang Jie	Team	—N/a	Vietnam (VIE); W 3–1	Singapore (SGP); W 3–2	Thailand (THA); L 0–3	2nd place, silver medalist(s)

Women

Athlete	Event	First Round	Quarterfinal	Semifinal	Final	
Athlete	Event	Opposition Score	Opposition Score	Opposition Score	Opposition Score	Rank
Siti Nurshuhaini	Singles	J Hooi (SGP); W (21–19, 21–11)	P Chochuwong (THA); L (17–21, 8–21)	did not advance		
Loh Zhi Wei	Singles	M J de Guzman (PHI); L (14–21, 17–21)	did not advance			
Yap Ling; Go Pei Kee	Doubles	I Khan / B Lim Z R (SGP); L (21–10, 14–21, 18–21)	did not advance			
Cheah Yee See; Cheng Su Hui	Doubles	P Thị Khánh / T Vân Anh (VIE); W (21–17, 13–21, 21–14)	A M N Albo / T M Pomar (PHI); W (21–13, 21–11)	B Aimsaard / N Aimsaard (THA); L (16–21, 6–21)	Did not advance	3rd place, bronze medalist(s)
Siti Nurshuhaini; Loh Zhi Wei; Ong Xin Yee; Siti Zulaikha; Yap Ling; Go Pei Kee; Cheng Su Yin; Cheng Su Hui; Cheah Yee See; Peck Yen Wei	Team	—N/a	Vietnam (VIE); L 1–3	did not advance		

Mixed

Athlete	Event	First Round	Quarterfinal	Semifinal	Final	
Athlete	Event	Opposition Score	Opposition Score	Opposition Score	Opposition Score	Rank
Hoo Pang Ron; Cheah Yee See	Doubles	D Vorlasing / V Kommanivanh (LAO); W (21–7, 21–7)	C Charoenkitamorn / L Kanlaha (THA); W (21–8, 21–16)	A Maulana / M C Bandaso (INA); W (18–21, 21–16, 21–18)	Chen T J Peck Y W (MAS); L (21–15, 19–21, 13–21)	2nd place, silver medalist(s)
Chen Tang Jie; Peck Yen Wei	Doubles	V Vannthoun / S Somalyta (CAM); W (21–5, 21–9)	T Hee / Tan W H (SGP); W (21–19, 21–19)	R Rivaldy / P H Mentari (INA); W (20–22, 21–13, 21–18)	Hoo P R Cheah Y S (MAS); W (15–21, 21–19, 21–13)	1st place, gold medalist(s)

== Basketball ==
Basketball 3x3

Team	Event	Qualifying Round							Semifinal	Final / BM	
Team	Event	Opposition Score	Opposition Score	Opposition Score	Opposition Score	Opposition Score	Opposition Score	Rank	Opposition Score	Opposition Score	Rank
Malaysia men's 3x3	Men's 3x3	Thailand (THA); L 14–21	Indonesia (INA); L 19–20	Singapore (SGP); W 21–16	Vietnam (VIE); W 21–18	Philippines (PHI); L 14–20	Cambodia (CAM); W 21–14	5	did not advance		
Malaysia women's 3x3	Women's 3x3	Cambodia (CAM); W 21–2	Vietnam (VIE); L 13–21	Thailand (THA); L 8–21	Singapore (SGP); W 21–5	Indonesia (INA); L 11–21	Philippines (PHI); L 11–13	5	did not advance		

Basketball 5x5

Team	Event	Qualifying Round							Semifinal	Final / BM	
Team	Event	Opposition Score	Opposition Score	Opposition Score	Opposition Score	Opposition Score	Opposition Score	Rank	Opposition Score	Opposition Score	Rank
Malaysia men's 5x5	Men's 5x5	Indonesia (INA); L 92–95	Thailand (THA); L 45–92	Cambodia (CAM); W 62–41	Singapore (SGP); W 75–58	Vietnam (VIE); L 74–97	Philippines (PHI); L 44–87	—N/a			5
Malaysia women's 5x5	Women's 5x5	Thailand (THA); W 70–67	Singapore (SGP); W 72–37	Indonesia (INA); L 52–70	Vietnam (VIE); L 65–69	Philippines (PHI); W 96–93	—N/a				3rd place, bronze medalist(s)

== Billiards ==
Men

Athlete	Event	Qualifying	Quarterfinal	Semifinal	Final	
Athlete	Event	Opposition Score	Opposition Score	Opposition Score	Opposition Score	Rank
Lim Kok Leong	Snooker 6 red singles	S Chhay (CAM); W 5–2	Aung P (MYA); W 5–1	K Poomjang (THA); W 5–2	J Roda (PHI); W 5–3	1st place, gold medalist(s)
Lim Kok Leong	Snooker singles	A B Ambatalia (PHI); W 4–0	S Sakbieng (LAO); W 4–1	P Suwannawat (THA); W 4–0	W Pu-ob-orm (THA); L 2–4	2nd place, silver medalist(s)
Moh Keen Hoo	Snooker 6 red singles	S Sakbieng (LAO); W 5–4	Win K K (MYA); W 5–3	J Roda (PHI); L 4–5	Did not advance	3rd place, bronze medalist(s)
Moh Keen Hoo	Snooker singles	—N/a	W Pu-ob-orm (THA); L 1–4	did not advance		
Muhammad Almie Yaakub	9-ball pool singles	P Visal (CAM); W 9–3	Toh L H (SGP); L 3–9	did not advance		
Muhammad Almie Yaakub	1-Cushion Carom Singles	—N/a	N T Thanh Tự (VIE); L 0–1	did not advance		
Muhammad Almie Yaakub	3-Cushion Carom Singles	—N/a	S Suwannasingh (THA); L 0–1	did not advance		
Darryl Chia Soo Yew	9-ball pool singles	C Biddo (PHI); L 7–9	did not advance			
Darryl Chia Soo Yew	1-Cushion Carom Singles	—N/a	P Quốc Tuấn (VIE); L 0–1	did not advance		
Darryl Chia Soo Yew	3-Cushion Carom Singles	—N/a	S Saetang (THA); L 0–1	did not advance		
Darryl Chia Soo Yew	Snooker 10 ball pool singles	V Peou (CAM); W 9–2	A Yapp (SGP); L 2–9	did not advance		
Kok Jken Yung	Snooker 10 ball pool singles	H Vongxay (LAO); L 7–9	did not advance			

Women

Athlete	Event	Qualifying	Quarterfinal	Semifinal	Final	
Athlete	Event	Opposition Score	Opposition Score	Opposition Score	Opposition Score	Rank
Suhana Dewi Sabtu	9-ball pool singles	V Kongkaket (THA); L 5–7	did not advance			
Suhana Dewi Sabtu	Snooker 10 ball pool singles	—N/a	R A Dacua (PHI); L 0–7	did not advance		

== Bodybuilding ==
Athlete	Event	Final
Athlete	Event	Rank
Azri Asmat Sefri	Men's 55kg	2nd place, silver medalist(s)
Malvern Abdullah	Men's 60kg	Did not advance
Malvern Abdullah	Men's 65kg	3rd place, bronze medalist(s)
Buda Anchah	Men's 70kg	2nd place, silver medalist(s)
Zmarul Al Adam Pulutan Abdullah	Men's 75kg	2nd place, silver medalist(s)
Zainal Arif Zainal Ariffin	Men's 80kg	3rd place, bronze medalist(s)
Muhammad Uzair Mat Noor	Men's 85kg	3rd place, bronze medalist(s)
Mohd Syarul Azman Mahen Abdullah	Men's athletic physique	1st place, gold medalist(s)
Ahmad Faiz Ariffin	Men's athletic physique	Did not advance
Shelen Aderina	Women's Bodybuilding	Did not advance
Meilaura Dora Jimmy	Women's Bodybuilding	Did not advance
Malvern Abdullah; Shelen Aderina	Mixed Pairs	3rd place, bronze medalist(s)
Buda Anchah; Meilaura Dora Jimmy	Mixed Pairs	Did not advance

== Bowling ==
Athlete	Event	Final	
Athlete	Event	Points	Rank
Muhammad Syarizol Shamsudin	Men's single	1,187	8
Shahrukh Amin Zulkifli	Men's single	1,199	7
Gillian Lim Siew Giok	Women's single	1,136	6
Nerosha Keligit Thiagarajan	Women's single	1,249	5
Shahrukh Amin Zulkifli; Muhammad Hafiz Zainuddin	Men's doubles	2,470	7
Nevern Netaneel Marcellinus; Muhammad Syarizol Shamsudin	Men's doubles	2,433	9
Nur Syazwani Sahar; Gillian Lim Siew Giok	Women's doubles	2,471	3rd place, bronze medalist(s)
Nerosha Keligit Thiagarajan; Nora Lyana Nastasia	Women's doubles	2,345	6
Shahrukh Amin Zulkifli; Nevern Netaneel Marcellinus; Muhammad Hafiz Zainuddin; Muhammad Syarizol Shamsudin	Men's team four	5,162	2nd place, silver medalist(s)
Nur Syazwani Sahar; Gillian Lim Siew Giok; Nerosha Keligit Thiagarajan; Nora Lyana Nastasia	Women's team four	4,951	2nd place, silver medalist(s)

== Chess ==
Men

Athlete	Event	Round 1	Round 2	Round 3	Round 4	Round 5	Round 6	Round 7	Round 8	Round 9	Semifinal	Final	
Athlete	Event	Opposition Score	Opposition Score	Opposition Score	Opposition Score	Opposition Score	Opposition Score	Opposition Score	Opposition Score	Opposition Score	Opposition Score	Opposition Score	Rank
Lye Lik Zang	Individual Standard	N Priasmoro (INA); L 0–1	Nay Oo K T (MYA); L 0–1	P Laohawirapap (THA); W 1–0	D Quizon (PHI); L 0–1	Wynn Z T (MYA); L 0–1	T Tuấn Minh (VIE); L 0–1	J P Gomez (PHI); D 0.5–0.5	Tin J (SGP); L 0–1	N N Trường Sơn (VIE); L 0–1	—N/a		
Yeoh Li Tian	Individual Standard	D Quizon (PHI); W 1–0	Tin J (SGP); D 0.5–0.5	T Tuấn Minh (VIE); W 1–0	N N Trường Sơn (VIE); D 0.5–0.5	J P Gomez (PHI); D 0.5–0.5	M Ervan (INA); D 0.5–0.5	Wynn Z T (MYA); W 1–0	N Priasmoro (INA); W 1–0	P Laohawirapap (THA); L 0–1	—N/a		
Yeoh Li Tian	Individual Rapid	Arunnuntapanich (THA); D 0.5–0.5	Quang Liêm (VIE); W 1–0	Nguyễn N T (VIE); D 0.5–0.5	Tin J (SGP); D 0.5–0.5	Nay Oo K T (MYA); W 1–0	—N/a				did not advance		
Yeoh Li Tian	Individual Blitz	W Kananub (THA); D 0.5–0.5	Lê Q L (VIE); L 0–1	Tin JY (SGP); D 0.5–0.5	—N/a	D Q Maravilla (PHI); L 0–1	—N/a						
Poh Yu Tian	Individual Rapid	—N/a	Megaranto (INA); L 0–1	Kulpruethanon (THA); D 0.5–0.5	Quang Liêm (VIE); L 0–1	Arunnuntapanich (THA); W 1–0	—N/a				did not advance		
Wong Yinn Long	Individual Blitz	—N/a	S W Cuhendi (INA); L 0–1	Lê Q L (VIE); L 0–1	M Han (MYA); D 0.5–0.5	P B Sales (PHI); W 1–0	—N/a						
Wong Yinn Long; Lim Zhuo Ren	Rapid Team	—N/a	Wynn Z T/ Nay Oo K T (MYA); L 0–2	N Priasmoro/ Y T Taher (INA); L 0.5–1.5	P B Sales/ D L Rosales (PHI); D 1–1	Lê Q L/ Trần T M (VIE); D 1–1	T Kulpruethanon/ T Arunnuntapanich (THA); L 0–2	—N/a					
Lim Zhou Ren; Poh Yu Tian	Blitz Team	S Megaranto/ M L Ali (INA); W 1.5–0.5	D Q Maravilla/ J E G Encarnacion (THA); L 0.5–1.5	Wynn Z H/ M Han (MYA); W 2–0	Lê Q L/ Lê T M (VIE); L 0–2	T Kulpruethanon/ P Laohawirapap (PHI); L 0.5–1.5	—N/a						

Women

Athlete	Event	Round 1	Round 2	Round 3	Round 4	Round 5	Round 6	Round 7	Round 8	Round 9	Semifinal	Final	
Athlete	Event	Opposition Score	Opposition Score	Opposition Score	Opposition Score	Opposition Score	Opposition Score	Opposition Score	Opposition Score	Opposition Score	Opposition Score	Opposition Score	Rank
Tan Li Ting	Individual Standard	Puteri Munajjah (MAS); D 0.5–0.5	D A A Citra (INA); L 0–1	J J Fronda (PHI); W 1–0	J M Frayna (PHI); W 1–0	I K Sukandar (INA); L 0–1	Gong Q (SGP); L 0–1	V T Kim Phung (VIE); D 0.5–0.5	A Prommuang (THA); W 1–0	H T Bảo Trâm (VIE); L 0–1	—N/a		
Puteri Munajjah Az-Zahraa Azhar	Individual Standard	Tan L T (MAS); D 0.5–0.5	V T Kim Phung (VIE); L 0–1	A Prommuang (THA); L 0–1	H T Bảo Trâm (VIE); L 0–1	Gong Q (SGP); D 0.5–0.5	D A A Citra (INA); L 0–1	J J Fronda (PHI); L 0–1	J M Frayna (PHI); L 0–1	I K Sukandar (INA); L 0–1	—N/a		
Chua Jia Tien	Individual Rapid	—N/a	Qianyun (SGP); L 0–1	Thùy Dương (VIE); L 0–1	A Citra (INA); L 0–1	I K Sukandar (INA); L 0–1	—N/a				did not advance		
Chua Jia Tien	Individual Blitz	Qianyun (SGP); D 0.5–0.5	P L T Nguyên (VIE); L 0–1	S M M Garcia (PHI); L 0–1	—N/a	S Bootsumran (THA); W 1–0	—N/a						
Sim Jia Ru	Individual Rapid	—N/a	A Citra (INA); W 1–0	Marie (PHI); L 0–1	B Galas (PHI); W 1–0	Thùy Dương (VIE); D 0.5–0.5	—N/a				Nguyen P L (VIE); L 0–2	Did not advance	3rd place, bronze medalist(s)
Puteri Rifqah Fahada Azhar	Individual Blitz	C M I Sihite (INA); L 0–1	S M M Garcia (PHI); D 0.5–0.5	—N/a	J M Frayna (PHI); L 0–1	N Khantree (THA); W 1–0	—N/a						
Sim Jia Ru; Tan Li Ting	Rapid Team	M W Aulia/ U Fisabilillah (INA); L 0–2	C Sarocha/ M S Buhagiar (THA); W 2–0	—N/a	P L T Nguyên/ V T K Phụng (VIE); L 0–2	J M F Bermas/ M A S D Moralde (PHI); W 1.5–0.5	—N/a						
Puteri Rifqah Fahada Azhar; Puteri Munajjah Az-Zahraa Azhar	Blitz Team	Nguyen P L/ Nguyễn T M H (VIE); D 1–1	C Sarocha/ A Prommuang (THA); W 2–0	—N/a	C M I Sihite/ U Fisabilillah (INA); L 0.5–1.5	J M Frayna/ S M M Garcia (PHI); D 1–1	—N/a						3rd place, bronze medalist(s)

== Cycling ==
Mountain biking

Athlete	Event	Qualification		Final	
Athlete	Event	Time	Rank	Time	Rank
Amer Akhbar Anuar	Men's downhill	03:31:54.500	9 Q	03:21:60.500	6
Mohamad Faris Mohd Nashari	Men's downhill	03:21:12.400	7 Q	03:22:30.700	7
Nia Vanessa Suhana Zaidi	Women's downhilll	04:06:65.800	8 Q	04:06:53.700	6
Siti Natasha Mohd Basri	Women's downhilll	03:55:45.200	5 Q	03:56:69.200	5

Road cycling

== Dancesport ==
Athlete	Event	Final	
Athlete	Event	Points	Rank
Ooi Say Keat; Chen Xin Nee	Samba	30.600	4
Ooi Say Keat; Chen Xin Nee	Cha-Cha-Cha	30.600	5
Ooi Say Keat; Chen Xin Nee	Paso Doble	30.650	5
Ooi Say Onn; Chong Kar Man	Rumba	31.550	4
Ooi Say Onn; Chong Kar Man	Jive	31.550	4

== Diving ==
Malaysia will be sending a total of 12 divers, 7 male and 5 female.

Men

Athlete	Event	Final	
Athlete	Event	Points	Rank
Ooi Tze Liang	1m springboard	377.70	1st place, gold medalist(s)
Bertrand Rhodict	1m springboard	284.90	3rd place, bronze medalist(s)
Muhammad Syafiq Puteh	3m springboard	381.35	1st place, gold medalist(s)
Gabriel Gilbert Daim	3m springboard	340.35	2nd place, silver medalist(s)
Ooi Tze Liang; Chew Yi Wei	Synchronized 3m springboard	395.79	1st place, gold medalist(s)
Jellson Jabillin; Hanis Nazirul Jaya Surya	Synchronized 10m platform	345.93	1st place, gold medalist(s)

Women

Athlete	Event	Final	
Athlete	Event	Points	Rank
Nur Dhabitah Sabri	1m springboard	290.45	1st place, gold medalist(s)
Kimberly Bong	1m springboard	230.00	2nd place, silver medalist(s)
Ng Yan Yee	3m springboard	270.60	1st place, gold medalist(s)
Ong Ker Ying	3m springboard	242.40	2nd place, silver medalist(s)
Ng Yan Yee; Ong Ker Ying	Synchronized 3m springboard	276.30	1st place, gold medalist(s)
Pandelela Rinong; Nur Dhabitah Sabri	Synchronized 10m platform	292.14	1st place, gold medalist(s)

== Fencing ==
=== Men ===
Athlete	Event	Preliminaries Pool		Quarterfinals	Semifinals	Finals	
Athlete	Event	Opponent Score	Seed	Opposition Score	Opposition Score	Opposition Score	Rank
Yu Peng Kean	Individual sabre	Chan (SGP); L 2-5	9	did not advance			
Yu Peng Kean	Individual sabre	Nguyễn (VIE); L 3-5	9	did not advance			
Yu Peng Kean	Individual sabre	V Srinualnad (THA); L 1-5	9	did not advance			
Yu Peng Kean	Individual sabre	Christian J (PHI); L 1-5	9	did not advance			
Cheng Xin Han	Individual foil	Nathaniel P (PHI); W 5-1	7	Nguyễn (VIE); L 8-15	did not advance		
Cheng Xin Han	Individual foil	Jonathan A (SGP); L 0-5	7	Nguyễn (VIE); L 8-15	did not advance		
Cheng Xin Han	Individual foil	Wangpaisit (THA); L 3-5	7	Nguyễn (VIE); L 8-15	did not advance		
Cheng Xin Han	Individual foil	Pham (VIE); W 5-4	7	Nguyễn (VIE); L 8-15	did not advance		
Cheng Xin Han	Individual foil	J Metha (CAM); W 5-3	7	Nguyễn (VIE); L 8-15	did not advance		
Hans Yoong Wei Shen	Individual foil	Nguyễn (VIE); W 5-4	4	S T Lopez (PHI); W 15-8	Jonathan A (SGP); L 11-15	did not advance	3rd place, bronze medalist(s)
Hans Yoong Wei Shen	Individual foil	M Kimleng (CAM); W 5-0	4	S T Lopez (PHI); W 15-8	Jonathan A (SGP); L 11-15	did not advance	3rd place, bronze medalist(s)
Hans Yoong Wei Shen	Individual foil	P Srisawat (THA); W 5-1	4	S T Lopez (PHI); W 15-8	Jonathan A (SGP); L 11-15	did not advance	3rd place, bronze medalist(s)
Hans Yoong Wei Shen	Individual foil	S T Lopez (PHI); L 1-5	4	S T Lopez (PHI); W 15-8	Jonathan A (SGP); L 11-15	did not advance	3rd place, bronze medalist(s)
Hans Yoong Wei Shen	Individual foil	Kieran H (SGP); L 4-5	4	S T Lopez (PHI); W 15-8	Jonathan A (SGP); L 11-15	did not advance	3rd place, bronze medalist(s)
Mohamad Roslan Mohamed	Individual épée	C Chaloemchanen (THA); L 3-5	8	Nguyễn (VIE); L 10-15	did not advance		
Mohamad Roslan Mohamed	Individual épée	Nguyễn (VIE); L 1-5	8	Nguyễn (VIE); L 10-15	did not advance		
Mohamad Roslan Mohamed	Individual épée	J Miguel (PHI); W 5-3	8	Nguyễn (VIE); L 10-15	did not advance		
Mohamad Roslan Mohamed	Individual épée	S Saknuk (CAM); W 5-3	8	Nguyễn (VIE); L 10-15	did not advance		
Mohamad Roslan Mohamed	Individual épée	S Lee (SGP); L 1-5	8	Nguyễn (VIE); L 10-15	did not advance		
Joshua Koh I Jie	Individual épée	N Singkam (THA); W 5-3	3	Nguyễn (VIE); W 13-12	J Garcia (PHI); L 5-15	did not advance	3rd place, bronze medalist(s)
Joshua Koh I Jie	Individual épée	Nguyễn Phước Đến (VIE); W 5-2	3	Nguyễn (VIE); W 13-12	J Garcia (PHI); L 5-15	did not advance	3rd place, bronze medalist(s)
Joshua Koh I Jie	Individual épée	J Garcia (PHI); L 2-5	3	Nguyễn (VIE); W 13-12	J Garcia (PHI); L 5-15	did not advance	3rd place, bronze medalist(s)
Joshua Koh I Jie	Individual épée	S To (SGP); W 5-2	3	Nguyễn (VIE); W 13-12	J Garcia (PHI); L 5-15	did not advance	3rd place, bronze medalist(s)
Joshua Koh I Jie	Individual épée	T Tangchin (CAM); W 5-3	3	Nguyễn (VIE); W 13-12	J Garcia (PHI); L 5-15	did not advance	3rd place, bronze medalist(s)

=== Women ===
Athlete	Event	Preliminaries Pool		Round of 16	Quarterfinals	Semi-finals	Finals	
Athlete	Event	Opponent Score	Seed	Opposition Score	Opposition Score	Opposition Score	Opposition Score	Rank
Philippa Jean Ong Ziyi	Individual foil	M Wong (SGP); L 2-5	5	—N/a	C Shinnakerdchoke (THA); L 13-15	did not advance		
Philippa Jean Ong Ziyi	Individual foil	Đỗ T A (VIE); W 5-3	5	—N/a	C Shinnakerdchoke (THA); L 13-15	did not advance		
Philippa Jean Ong Ziyi	Individual foil	Y Liza (CAM); W 5-1	5	—N/a	C Shinnakerdchoke (THA); L 13-15	did not advance		
Philippa Jean Ong Ziyi	Individual foil	S Doungpattra (THA); W 5-0	5	—N/a	C Shinnakerdchoke (THA); L 13-15	did not advance		
Philippa Jean Ong Ziyi	Individual foil	S Catantan (PHI); L 1-5	5	—N/a	C Shinnakerdchoke (THA); L 13-15	did not advance		
Suraya Rizzal	Individual foil	C Shinnakerdchoke (THA); L 3-5	8	Nguyễn (VIE); L 8-15	did not advance			
Suraya Rizzal	Individual foil	Nguyễn (VIE); W 5-2	8	Nguyễn (VIE); L 8-15	did not advance			
Suraya Rizzal	Individual foil	C Linly (CAM); W 5-2	8	Nguyễn (VIE); L 8-15	did not advance			
Suraya Rizzal	Individual foil	C Kemei (SGP); L 3-5	8	Nguyễn (VIE); L 8-15	did not advance			
Suraya Rizzal	Individual foil	M Isabel (PHI); L 4-5	8	Nguyễn (VIE); L 8-15	did not advance			

== Finswimming ==
Men

Athlete	Event	Heats		Final	
Athlete	Event	Time	Rank	Time	Rank
Liew Ee Chern	50m Surface	21.92	13	did not advance	
Khiew Tze Yean	100m Bi Fins	45.96	5 Q	45.76	6
Saw Jin Er	100m Bi Fins	48.63	10	did not advance	
Saw Jin Er	50m Surface	19.39	9	did not advance	

Women

Athlete	Event	Heats		Final	
Athlete	Event	Time	Rank	Time	Rank
Cheng Ka Man	100m Bi Fins	54.35	10	did not advance	
Leong Wan Mei	100m Bi Fins	52.78	7 Q	52.21	6

Mixed

Athlete	Event	Heats		Final	
Athlete	Event	Time	Rank	Time	Rank
Saw Jin Er; Cheng Ka Man; Leong Wan Mei; Khiew Tze Yean	100m Bi Fins	—N/a		3:17.14	4

== Football ==
Malaysia will only be participating in the men's tournament, sending a total of 20 players.

Team	Event	Group Stage					Semifinal	Final / BM	
Team	Event	Opposition Score	Opposition Score	Opposition Score	Opposition Score	Rank	Opposition Score	Opposition Score	Rank
Malaysia men's	Men's tournament	Thailand; W 2–1	Laos; W 3–1	Singapore; D 2–2	Cambodia; D 2–2	2 Q	Vietnam; L 0–1	Indonesia; L 1 (3)–1 (4)	4

== Futsal ==
Team	Event	Group Stage				
Team	Event	Opposition Score	Opposition Score	Opposition Score	Opposition Score	Final Rank
Malaysia men's	Men's tournament	Thailand; L 2–6	Vietnam; L 1–7	Indonesia; L 0–3	Myanmar; D 4–4	5
Malaysia women's	Women's tournament	Thailand; L 0–4	Vietnam; L 1–4	Myanmar; D 3–3	—N/a	3rd place, bronze medalist(s)

== Golf ==
Individual

Athlete	Event	Round 1			Round 2			Final Round		
Athlete	Event	Score	To par	Rank	Score	To par	Rank	Score	To par	Rank
Rhaasrikanesh Kanavathi	Men's individual	75	3	=17	77	8	21	74	10	20
Marcus Lim Pang Chuen	Men's individual	75	3	=17	73	4	16	72	4	=13
Ervin Chang	Men's individual	73	1	=11	67	-4	=2	69	-7	1st place, gold medalist(s)
Nateeshvar Anatha Ganesh	Men's individual	74	2	=13	70	E	11	76	4	=13
Mirabel Ting Ern Hui	Women's individual	79	7	14	69	4	=8	70	2	7
Jeneath Wong	Women's individual	71	-1	=3	71	-2	3	69	-5	3rd place, bronze medalist(s)
Ng Jing Xuen	Women's individual	84	12	19	76	16	=18	75	19	15

Team

Athlete	Event	Quarterfinal	Semifinal	Final	
Athlete	Event	Opposition Score	Opposition Score	Opposition Score	Rank
Ervin Chang; Rhaasrikanesh Kanavathi; Marcus Lim Pang Chuen	Men's team	Myanmar (MYA); D 1.5–1.5	Indonesia (INA); W 2–1	Thailand (THA); W 2–1	1st place, gold medalist(s)
Jeneath Wong; Mirabel Ting Ern Hui	Women's team	Vietnam (VIE); W 2–0	Singapore (SGP); W 2–0	Thailand (THA); L 0.5–1.5	2nd place, silver medalist(s)

== Gymnastics ==
=== Artistic ===
==== Men ====
All-around

Athlete	Event	Total All-Around	
Athlete	Event	Score	Rank
Zul Bahrin Mat Asri	All-around	70.150	
Teoh Chuen Feng	All-around	36.350	
Tan Fu Jie	All-around	25.050	
Ng Chun Chen	All-around	72.750	
Shahrul Aimy	All-around	38.500	
Luqman Al Hafiz Zulfa	All-around	73.900	
Total	Team all-around	295.850	4

Apparatus Finals

Athlete	Floor (gymnastics)		Pommel horse		Rings (gymnastics)		Vault (gymnastics)		Parallel bars		Horizontal bar	
Athlete	Score	Rank	Score	Rank	Score	Rank	Score	Rank	Score	Rank	Score	Rank
Tan Fu Jie	—N/a		14.200	2nd place, silver medalist(s)	—N/a		—N/a		—N/a		—N/a	
Shahrul Aimy	—N/a		12.500	3rd place, bronze medalist(s)	—N/a		13.550	6	—N/a		—N/a	
Ng Chun Chen	—N/a		—N/a		12.267	6	—N/a		10.767	8	—N/a	
Luqman Al Hafiz Zulfa	12.767	7	—N/a		11.567	7	—N/a		11.600	6	—N/a	
Teoh Chuen Feng	—N/a		—N/a		—N/a		—N/a		—N/a		10.367	8

==== Women ====
All-around

Athlete	Event	Total All-Around	
Athlete	Event	Score	Rank
Geanie Ng Ee Ling	All-around	39.800	16
Rachel Yeoh Li Wen	All-around	48.550	3rd place, bronze medalist(s)
Total	Team all-around	88.350	6

Apparatus Finals

Athlete	Vault (gymnastics)		Uneven bars		Balance beam		Floor (gymnastics)	
Athlete	Score	Rank	Score	Rank	Score	Rank	Score	Rank
Geanie Ng Ee Ling	11.800	7	—N/a		—N/a		—N/a	
Rachel Yeoh Li Wen	—N/a		13.000	1st place, gold medalist(s)	12.567	1st place, gold medalist(s)	11.467	8

=== Rhythmic ===
Individual and Group Qualification

Athlete	Event	Qualifying		Final	
Athlete	Event	Total Score	Rank	Total Score	Rank
Ng Joe Ee	All-around	98.200	3 Q	104.600	2nd place, silver medalist(s)
Koi Sie Yan	All-around	101.600	1 Q	109.100	1st place, gold medalist(s)
Izzah Amzan	All-around	100.150	2	did not advance	
	Group				

== Karate ==
Kata

Athlete	Event	1st Round		2nd Round	
Athlete	Event	Opposition Result	Rank	Opposition Result	Rank
Muhammad Aiqal Asmadie	Men's individual	22.74	3	K Theng (CAM); W 23.08–22.74	3rd place, bronze medalist(s)
Oh Theng Wei; Thomson Hoe; Emmanuel Leong	Men's team	23.14	2	Philippines (PHI); W 24.0–23.0	3rd place, bronze medalist(s)
Lovely Anne Robberth	Women's individual	23.48	2	R C Torres (PHI); L 23.34–24.28	4
Khaw Yee Voon; Chang Sin Yi; Lim Hui Ling	Women's team	23.68	3	Cambodia (CAM); W 22.74–22.26	3rd place, bronze medalist(s)

Kumite

Athlete	Event	1st Round	2nd Round	Final / BM	
Athlete	Event	Opposition Result	Opposition Result	Opposition Result	Rank
Prem Kumar Selvam	Men's -60kg	A Saputra (INA); L 4–1	—N/a	Ly K (CAM); W 6–3	3rd place, bronze medalist(s)
Sureeya Sankar Hari Sankar	Men's -67kg	M J M Coronel (PHI); W 8–0	Đặng H S (VIE); W 3–1	T Hutapea (INA); W 6–3	1st place, gold medalist(s)
Sharmendran Raghonathan	Men's -75kg	Chu Đ T (VIE); W 3–1	P I L A Escover (PHI); W 10–3	I J Kandou (INA); W 3–1	1st place, gold medalist(s)
Kathish Gnanasekaran	Men's -84kg	C F Nenobesi (INA); L 0–5	did not advance		
Sharmendran Raghonathan; Prem Kumar Selvam; Sankar Sureeya Sankar Hari	Men's team	Laos (LAO); W 2–0	Vietnam (VIE); W 3–0	Indonesia (INA); W 3–0	1st place, gold medalist(s)
Shahmalarani Chandran	Women's -50kg	S V Ririhena (INA); W 9–1	L Kengthong (LAO); W 8–0	C Chippensuk (THA); W W/O	1st place, gold medalist(s)
Madhuri Poovanesan	Women's -55kg	Bye	Hoàng T M T (VIE); L 1–11	J C L Berberabe (PHI); L 0–1	4
Mathivani Murugeesan	Women's -61kg	Nguyễn T N (VIE); L 3–4	did not advance		
Amirah Syahirah Azlan	Women's -68kg	Bye	C G Zefanya (INA); L 3–5	S Phuong (CAM); W 2–1	3rd place, bronze medalist(s)
Zakiah Adnan	Women's -68kg	Bye	D R Banurea (INA); L 2–3	S Vann (CAM); L 2–8	4
Preyancli Santhiran; Siti Nur Azwani Nor Azli; Mathivani Murugeesan; Madhuri Poovanesan	Women's team	Indonesia (INA); L 8–10	—N/a	Thailand (THA); W 2–1	3rd place, bronze medalist(s)

== Kickboxing ==
Men

Athlete	Event	Quarterfinal	Semifinal	Final	
Athlete	Event	Opposition Score	Opposition Score	Opposition Score	Rank
Awang Handra Awang Muhammad Hazmie	Low Kick -63.5 kg	S Rakim (CAM); L 0–3	did not advance		
Ain Kamaruddin	Low Kick -60 kg	D E Cantores (PHI); L 0–3	did not advance		
Awangku Abdul Rahman	Low Kick -54 kg	—N/a	H Kan Meng (CAM); L 1–2	Did not advance	3rd place, bronze medalist(s)
Athachai Saiprawat	Full Contact -67 kg	—N/a	N Thế Hưởng (VIE); L 0–3	Did not advance	3rd place, bronze medalist(s)
Seaw Wei Sheng	Full Contact -57 kg	—N/a	T Rachhan (CAM); L 0–3	Did not advance	3rd place, bronze medalist(s)
Mohammad Rifdean Masdor	Full Contact -51 kg	K Khlaneang (CAM); W 3–0	H Văn Tuấn (VIE); L 0–3	Did not advance	3rd place, bronze medalist(s)

Women

Athlete	Event	Quarterfinal	Semifinal	Final	
Athlete	Event	Opposition Score	Opposition Score	Opposition Score	Rank
Vireen Teo	Full Contact -48 kg	N T Hằng Nga (VIE); L 0–3	did not advance		
Hayatun Najihin	Low Kick -60 kg	—N/a	G Araos (PHI); L 0–3	Did not advance	3rd place, bronze medalist(s)

== Pencak silat ==
Seni

Athlete	Event	Elimination Rounds	Semifinal	Final	
Athlete	Event	Opposition Score	Opposition Score	Opposition Score	Rank
Luqman Laji	Men's tunggal	V Tiến Dũng (VIE); W 9.945–9.940	I Sadara (THA); L 9.910–9.960	Did not advance	3rd place, bronze medalist(s)
Muhammad Taqiyuddin Hamid; Sazzlan Yuga	Men's ganda	A Abad / A J Abad (PHI); W 9.940–9.930	T Đức Danh / L Hồng Quân (VIE); W 9.915–9.895	Hazim M Zaque / Haziq M Zaque (SGP); W 9.950–9.905	1st place, gold medalist(s)
Muhammad Syafiq Ibrahim; Nashrul Edzam Mohd Asri; Muhammad Shukrillah Badrillah	Men's regu	Philippines (PHI); L 9.915–9.920	did not advance		
Nur Syafiqah Hamzah	Women's tunggal	P A Sari (INA); L 9.900–9.990	did not advance		
Nor Hamizah Abu Hassan; Nur Syazreen Abdul Malik	Women's ganda	Bye	N T Thu Hà / N T Huyền (VIE); L 9.900–9.910	Did not advance	3rd place, bronze medalist(s)
Fatin Ardani Zamri; Siti Nur Khairunissa Hail; Merrywati Manuil	Women's regu	Philippines (PHI); W 9.920–9.920	Brunei (BRU); L 9.930–9.930	Did not advance	3rd place, bronze medalist(s)

Tanding

Athlete	Event	Quarterfinal	Semifinal	Final	
Athlete	Event	Opposition Score	Opposition Score	Opposition Score	Rank
Muhammad Khairi Adib Azhar	Men's class B	T Bo (LAO); W 68–25	S Salaeh (THA); W 49–36	K Mustakim (INA); W 50–49	1st place, gold medalist(s)
Mohamad Hazim Amzad	Men's class C	P Mitthasan (THA); W 51–49	M Y Arafa (INA); L 31–46	Did not advance	3rd place, bronze medalist(s)
Ahmad Atif Irsyad	Men's class D	M J Lacao (PHI); W 5–1	Chemaeng (THA); L W/O	Did not advance	3rd place, bronze medalist(s)
Mohd Al-Jufferi Jamari	Men's class F	I C Pratama (INA); W 53–51	Abdul Raazaq (SGP); L 21–26	Did not advance	3rd place, bronze medalist(s)
Mohd Fauzi Khalid	Men's class G	Bye	N Tấn Sang (VIE); L 24–37	Did not advance	3rd place, bronze medalist(s)
Mohammad Amiruddin Azmi	Men's class H	J Paul (PHI); W 65–51	Nguyen D T (VIE); L 8–25	Did not advance	3rd place, bronze medalist(s)
Muhammad Robial Sobri	Men's class J	Duangvilai (LAO); W 70–58	S Farhan (SGP); L 11–13	Did not advance	3rd place, bronze medalist(s)
Billage Anak Nakang	Men's open	—N/a	Bye	L Văn Toản (VIE); L 17–30	2nd place, silver medalist(s)
Siti Shazwana Ajak	Women's class E	S Andriani (INA); W 58–6	J Wankrue (THA); W 56–37	Nurul Suhaila (SGP); L 22–30	2nd place, silver medalist(s)
Siti Rahmah Mohamed Nasir	Women's class F	Bye	Siti Khadijah (SGP); W 70–46	Q T Thu Nghĩa (VIE); L 32–39	2nd place, silver medalist(s)

== Pétanque ==
Shooting

Athlete	Event	Elimination Rounds		Semifinal		Final	
Athlete	Event	Score	Rank	Score	Rank	Score	Rank
Mohamad Nuzul Azwan	Men's shooting	24	6	did not advance			
Nurul Balqis Fuzian	Women's shooting	24	5	did not advance			

Doubles

Athlete	Event	Elimination Rounds	Semifinal	Final	
Athlete	Event	Opposition score	Opposition score	Opposition score	Rank
Syed Akmal Fikri; Muhammad Hafizuddin Mat Daud	Men's double		did not advance		
Nurashimah Senin; Sharifah Aqilah Farhana	Women's double		Laos (LAO); W 13–7	Vietnam (VIE); L 2–13	2nd place, silver medalist(s)

Triples

Athlete	Event	Elimination Rounds	Semifinal	Final	
Athlete	Event	Opposition score	Opposition score	Opposition score	Rank
Nur Afiqah Jasni; Nur Adilah Ramli; Nurul Hazirah Izzati Hussin	Women's triples				

== Rowing ==
Men

Athlete	Event	Heats		Final	
Athlete	Event	Time	Rank	Time	Rank
Mohamad Amirul Norhadi	Lightweight single sculls	7:24.691	4 Q	7:47.071	4

== Sepak takraw ==
Men

Athlete	Event	Group Stage				Semi Final	Final	
Athlete	Event	Opposition score	Opposition score	Opposition score	Rank	Opposition score	Opposition score	Rank
Afifuddin Razali; Noraizat Nordin; Aidil Aiman Azwawi	Doubles	Indonesia (INA); W 2–0	Cambodia (CAM); W 2–0	—N/a	1	Philippines (PHI); W 2–0	Indonesia (INA); L 1–2	2nd place, silver medalist(s)
Zarif Marican Ibrahim Marican; Faisal Fuad; Afifuddin Razali; Noraizat Nordin; Norfaizzul Abd Razak	Regu	Thailand (THA); L 0–2	Vietnam (VIE); W 2–0	—N/a	2 Q	Philippines (PHI); W 2–0	Thailand (THA); L 0–2	2nd place, silver medalist(s)
Zuhri Zain; Zarif Marican Ibrahim Marican; Aidil Aiman Azwawi; Afifuddin Razali; Faisal Fuad; Norfaizzul Abd Razak; Noraizat Nordin; Haziq Hairul Nizam; Redwan Hakim; Zulhasni Basri; Eqbal Shamsudin; Asyraaf Hadi	Team regu	Thailand (THA); L 0–3	Cambodia (CAM); W 3–0	Vietnam (VIE); W 2–1	—N/a			2nd place, silver medalist(s)

Women

Athlete	Event	Group Stage					Semi Final	Final	
Athlete	Event	Opposition score	Opposition score	Opposition score	Opposition score	Rank	Opposition score	Opposition score	Rank
	Quard	Thailand (THA); L 0–2	Myanmar (MYA); L 0–2	—N/a		3	did not advance		
Siti Nor Zubaidah Che Abd Wahab; Siti Nor Suhaida Jafri; Kamisah Khamis; Nur Asmida Rambli; Razman Anam	Regu	Myanmar (MYA); W 2–0	Vietnam (VIE); L 0–2	Thailand (THA); L 0–2	Cambodia (CAM); W 2–0	—N/a			3rd place, bronze medalist(s)
Siti Nor Zubaidah Che Abd Wahab; Siti Nor Suhaida Jafri; Nur Fatihah Azizul; Nur Natasha Amira Fazil; Nor Azira Suhaimi; Razman Anam; Nadillatul Rosmahani Saidin; Nurul Izzatul Hikmah Md Zulkifli; Kamisah Khamis; Nur Fateha Rossli; Nur Asmida Rambli; Siti Farisha Ismi Hissan	Team regu	Laos (LAO); W 2–1	Vietnam (VIE); L 0–3	Thailand (THA); L 0–3	—N/a	—N/a			3rd place, bronze medalist(s)

== Swimming ==
Men

Athlete	Event	Heats		Final	
Athlete	Event	Time	Rank	Time	Rank
Lim Yin Chuen	50m butterfly	25.41	9	did not advance	
Lim Yin Chuen	100m butterfly	55.91	10	did not advance	
Lim Yin Chuen	200m butterfly	2:06.65	8 Q	2:06.07	8
Bryan Leong Xin Ren	50m freestyle	23.29	5 Q	23.09 NR	5
Bryan Leong Xin Ren	50m butterfly	24.66	5 Q	24.58	6
Bryan Leong Xin Ren	100m butterfly	55.04	5 Q	54.79	7
Ng Jing Fu	50m breaststroke	29.10	6 Q	28.96	5
Ng Jing Fu	100m breaststroke	1:03.72	7 Q	1:03.61	6
Hii Puong Wei	50m breaststroke	29.28	7 Q	28.81	4
Hii Puong Wei	100m breaststroke	1:04.13	6 Q	1:04.47	8
Hii Puong Wei	200m breaststroke	2:21.97	7 Q	2:21.04	8
Hii Puong Wei	200m individual medley	2:06.49	6 Q	2:07.64	8
Job Tan Xi Jay	200m breaststroke	2:21.11	5 Q	2:17.68	3rd place, bronze medalist(s)
Welson Sim	100m freestyle	50.84	5 Q	50.81	5
Welson Sim	200m freestyle	1:52.43	2 Q	1:50.63	6
Welson Sim	400m freestyle	4:01.37	4 Q	4:02.66	6
Arvin Shaun Singh Chahal	50m freestyle	23.82	9	did not advance	
Arvin Shaun Singh Chahal	50m backstroke	27.67	8 Q	27.23	5
Arvin Shaun Singh Chahal	100m freestyle	51.69	9	did not advance	
Arvin Shaun Singh Chahal	200m individual medley	2:07.55	9	did not advance	
Khiew Hoe Yean	200m backstroke	—N/a		2:01.67	2nd place, silver medalist(s)
Khiew Hoe Yean	200m freestyle	1:52.19	1 Q	1:47.81	1st place, gold medalist(s)
Khiew Hoe Yean	400m freestyle	4:06.06	7 Q	3:52.03	2nd place, silver medalist(s)
Khiew Hoe Yean	800m freestyle	—N/a		8:06.71	3rd place, bronze medalist(s)
Low Zheng Yong	200m butterfly	2:04.11	6 Q	2:04.10	7
Tan Khai Xin	400m individual medley	—N/a		4:30.91	5
Tan Khai Xin	1500m freestyle	—N/a		16:04.91	4
Sebastian Soon	400m individual medley	—N/a		4:32.16	6
Sebastian Soon	1500m freestyle	—N/a		15:39.87	5
Sebastian Soon	800m freestyle	—N/a		8:12.64	5
Lim Yin Chuen; Welson Sim; Khiew Hoe Yean; Arvin Shaun Singh Chalal	4 × 100 m freestyle relay	—N/a		DSQ	
Lim Yin Chuen; Bryan Leong Xin Ren; Khiew Hoe Yean; Ng Jing Fu	4 × 100 m medley relay	—N/a		3:45.72	5
Lim Yin Chuen; Welson Sim; Khiew Hoe Yean; Arvin Shaun Singh Chalal	4 × 200 m freestyle relay	—N/a		7:19.75 NR	2nd place, silver medalist(s)

Women

Athlete	Event	Heats		Final	
Athlete	Event	Time	Rank	Time	Rank
Phee Jinq En	50m breaststroke	32.30	3 Q	32.43	5
Phee Jinq En	100m breaststroke	1:11.66	4 Q	1:09.60	2nd place, silver medalist(s)
Phee Jinq En	200m breaststroke	2:36.96	6 Q	2:35.83	5
Alicia Li Ann Soosai	50m breaststroke	33.40	8 Q	33.55	8
Alicia Li Ann Soosai	100m breaststroke	1:12.81	9	did not advance	
Alicia Li Ann Soosai	200m breaststroke	2:38.46	7 Q	2:36.96	7
Goh Chia Tong	800m freestyle	—N/a		9:04.33	5
Goh Chia Tong	1500m freestyle	—N/a		17:07.64 NR	4

== Table tennis ==
Men

Athlete	Event	Preliminary	Round of 32	Round of 16	Quarterfinals	Semi-finals	Finals	Rank
Athlete	Event	Opoosition Score	Opoosition Score	Opoosition Score	Opoosition Score	Opoosition Score	Opoosition Score	Rank
Leong Chee Fee	Singles	Bye	V Bun (CAM); W 3–0	Clarence C (SGP); L 2–3	did not advance			
Wong Qi Shen	Singles	Nguyễn Đ T (VIE); L 2–3	R G Pugoy (PHI); W 3–0	did not advance				
Danny Ng Wann Sing; Leong Chee Fee	Doubles	—N/a	L Đình Đức / H Đình Anh (VIE); L 2–3	did not advance				
Javen Choong; Wong Qi Shen	Doubles	—N/a		J M N Martinez / J M C Pido (PHI); W 3–0	N Anh Tu; Đ B Tuấn Anh (VIE); W 3–1	C Chew; P S F Ethan (SGP); L 0–3	Did not advance	3rd place, bronze medalist(s)

Women

Athlete	Event	Preliminary	Round of 32	Round of 16	Quarterfinals	Semi-finals	Finals	Rank
Athlete	Event	Opposition Score	Opposition Score	Opposition Score	Opposition Score	Opposition Score	Opposition Score	Rank
Chang Li Sian Alice	Singles	Bye	T Southammavong (LAO); W 3–0	Z Jian (SGP); L 1–3	Did not advance			
Ho Ying	Singles	Bye	Y Chanrotana (CAM); W 3–0	N Kongphet (LAO); W 3–0	Zhou JY (SGP); W 3–1	S Sawettabut (THA); L 0–3	Did not advance	3rd place, bronze medalist(s)
Chang Li Sian Alice; Tee Ai Xin	Doubles	—N/a		S M O Jurada / E R D Pescadero (PHI); W 3–0	S Sawettabut; O Paranang (THA); L 0–3	did not advance		
Ho Ying; Karen Lyne Anak Dick	Doubles	—N/a		B Insou / K Chendaroth (CAM); W 3–0	J Sawettabut; A Wanwisa (THA); W 3–0	Z Jingyi; Z Jian (SGP); L 0–3	Did not advance	3rd place, bronze medalist(s)

Mixed

Athlete	Event	Round of 16	Quarterfinals	Semifinals	Finals	Rank
Athlete	Event	Opposition Score	Opposition Score	Opposition Score	Opposition Score	Rank
Tee Ai Xin; Wong Qi Shen	Doubles	K R Cruz / J Adasa (PHI); W 3–1	W Xin Ru / P Y En Koen (SGP); L 2–3	did not advance		
Karen Lyne Dick; Choong Javen	Doubles	A J Laude / J M Nayre (PHI); W 3–2	C C Zhe Yu / Z Jian (SGP); L 1–3	did not advance		

Team

Team	Event	Preliminary Round		Rank	Semi-finals	Finals	Rank
Team	Event	Opposition Score	Opposition Score	Rank	Opposition Score	Opposition Score	Rank
Choong Javen; Leong Chee Feng; Wong Qi Shen	Men's team	Singapore (SGP); L 0–3	Philippines (PHI); W 3–0	2	Vietnam (VIE); W 3–1	Thailand (THA); L 1–3	2nd place, silver medalist(s)
Alice Chang; Ho Ying; Karen Lyne Dick	Women's team	Cambodia (CAM); W 3–0	Singapore (SGP); L 1–3	2	Thailand (THA); L 0–3	Did not advance	3rd place, bronze medalist(s)

== Tennis ==
Men

Athlete	Event	Round 1	Quarter-finals	Semifinals	Final	
Athlete	Event	Opposition Score	Opposition Score	Opposition Score	Opposition Score	Rank
Hao Sheng Koay	Singles	Trịnh L G (VIE); L 0–2	did not advance			
Imran Daniel Abdul Hazli	Singles	M R Fitriadi (INA); L 1–2	did not advance			
Darrshan Suresh; Muhammad Aiman Hamdan	Doubles	Nguyễn V P/ Lê Q K (VIE); L 0–2	did not advance			
Hao Sheng Koay; Syed Mohd Agil Syed Naguib	Doubles	V Rasavady/ S Simmalavong (LAO); W 2–0	R Gonzales/ T Huey (PHI); L 0–2	did not advance		
Koay Hao Sheng; Imran Daniel Abdul Hazli; Syed Agil	Team	Cambodia (CAM); W 2–1	—N/a	Indonesia (INA); L 0–2	Did not advance	3rd place, bronze medalist(s)

Women

Athlete	Event	Round 1	Quarter-finals	Semifinals	Final	
Athlete	Event	Opposition Score	Opposition Score	Opposition Score	Opposition Score	Rank
Saw Jo-Leen	Singles	Lynelle E T L (SGP); W 2–0	A Eala (PHI); L 0–2	did not advance		
Lim Sze Xuan	Singles	A Chanta (THA); L 0–2	did not advance			
Iman Syuhada Abdullah; Saw Jo-Leen	Doubles	P Lao/ S Chan (CAM); W 2–0	B Gumulya/ J Rompies (INA); L 0–2	did not advance		
Jawairiah Noordin; Sharifah Elysia Wan Abdul Rahman	Doubles	Bye	M Capadocia/ S H R Dionson (PHI); W 2–1	A Chanta/ P Cheapchandej (THA); W 2–1	Did not advance	3rd place, bronze medalist(s)
Saw Jo-Leen; Sharifah Elysia	Team	Philippines (PHI); L 0–2	—N/a	did not advance		

Mixed

Athlete	Event	Round 1	Semifinals	Final	
Athlete	Event	Opposition Score	Opposition Score	Opposition Score	Rank
Imran Daniel Abdul Hazli; Sharifah Elysia Wan Abdul Rahman	Doubles	A I Maruf/ J P Rompies (INA); L 1–2	did not advance		
Syed Mohd Agil Syed Naguib; Jawairiah Noordin	Doubles	F C A Belderol/ M J C Saldajeno (PHI); L 0–2	did not advance		

== Triathlon ==
Triathlon

Athlete	Event	Final	
Athlete	Event	Time	Rank
Chong Yoong Thiang	Men's individual	2:07.51	9
Nigel Ng Kar Kean	Men's individual	2:15.50	12
Esther Hong Joy Chen	Women's individual	2:21.42	6
Mayumi Shinozuka	Women's individual	2:30.18	7

Duathlon

Athlete	Event	Final	
Athlete	Event	Time	Rank
Nik Fakaruddin Ismail	Men's individual	No result	-
Muhammad Haziq Junaidy	Men's individual	No result	-
Tahira Najmunisaa Muhammad Zaid	Women's individual	2:14:22.00	2nd place, silver medalist(s)
Chia Ling Pow	Women's individual	2:22:30.00	7

== Volleyball ==
=== Beach ===
Team	Event	Preliminary round					Semi finals	Finals / BM	
Team	Event	Opposition Score	Opposition Score	Opposition Score	Opposition Score	Rank	Opposition Score	Opposition Score	Rank
Mohd Asri Bin Muharia; Shon Ngiap Shyang; Khairol Shazrime Shamsaimon; Sim Jian Qin	Men's team	Thailand; L 1–2	Laos; W 2–0	Indonesia; L 0–2	Cambodia; L 1–2	4	did not advance		
Farwizah Aina Ahmad Nizar; Maegan Beh Jia Yin; Foo Sin Xi; Sin Sing Yee	Women's team	Vietnam; L 0–2	Thailand; L 0–2	Indonesia; L 0–2	Singapore; L 1–2	5	did not advance		

=== Indoor ===
Team	Event	Preliminary round					Semi finals	Finals / BM	
Team	Event	Opposition Score	Opposition Score	Opposition Score	Opposition Score	Rank	Opposition Score	Opposition Score	Rank
Malaysia Men's	Men's tournament	Vietnam; L 0–3; 16–25, 14–25, 21–25	Myanmar; L 0–3; 13–25, 19–25, 22–25	Indonesia; L 0–3; 12–25, 11–25, 13–25	Philippines; L 0–3; 12–25, 13–25, 12–25	5	did not advance		
Malaysia Women's	Women's tournament	Philippines; L 0–3; 14–25, 20–25, 15–25	Indonesia; L 0–3; 10–25, 13–25, 5–25	Vietnam; L 0–3; 12–25, 9–25, 10–25	Thailand; L 0–3; 11–25, 18–25, 12–25	5	did not advance		

== Weightlifting ==
Men

Athlete	Event	Snatch	Clean & Jerk	Total	Rank
Mohamad Aniq Kasdan	55 kg	110	142	252	3rd place, bronze medalist(s)
Muhamad Aznil Bidin	61 kg	127	160	287	2nd place, silver medalist(s)
Muhammad Erry Hidayat	73 kg	143	173	316	3rd place, bronze medalist(s)
Mohd Nasir Roslan	81 kg	140	165	305	4
Muhammad Hafiz Shamsuddin	89+ kg	152	190	342	3rd place, bronze medalist(s)

Women

Athlete	Event	Snatch	Clean & Jerk	Total	Rank
Elly Cascandra Engelbert	55 kg	73	91	164	5
Marceeta Marlyn Marcus	59 kg	73	105	178	5
Sonia Cassendra Masnev	71+ kg	90	123	213	5

== Wushu ==
Taolu

Athlete	Event	Final	
Athlete	Event	Score	Rank
Tan Zhi Yan	Men's taolu taijiquan	9.71	1st place, gold medalist(s)
Tan Zhi Yan	Men's taolu taijijian	9.68	4
Calvin Lee Wai Leong	Men's taolu nanquan	9.67	6
Calvin Lee Wai Leong	Men's taolu nandao	9.68	2nd place, silver medalist(s)
Calvin Lee Wai Leong	Men's taolu nangun	9.42	8
Clement Ting Su Wei	Men's taolu changquan	9.70	1st place, gold medalist(s)
Clement Ting Su Wei	Men's taolu daoshu + gunshu	9.49	9
Yeap Wai Kin	Men's taolu changquan	9.68	4
Yeap Wai Kin	Men's taolu daoshu + gunshu	19.26	3rd place, bronze medalist(s)
Sydney Chin Sy Xuan	Women's taolu taijiquan	9.58	6
Sydney Chin Sy Xuan	Women's taolu taijijian	9.68	3rd place, bronze medalist(s)
Mandy Chen	Women's taolu taijiquan	9.41	7
Mandy Chen	Women's taolu taijijian	9.47	9
Pang Pui Yee	Women's taolu jianshu	9.36	7
Pang Pui Yee	Women's taolu qiangshu	9.67	5
Pang Pui Yee	Women's taolu changquan	9.42	8
Lee Jia Rong	Women's taolu daoshu + gunshu	19.12	4
Lee Jia Rong	Women's taolu changquan	9.47	7

Sanda

Athlete	Event	Quarterfinal	Semifinal	Final	
Athlete	Event	Opposition Score	Opposition Score	Opposition Score	Rank
Kelvin Teng Kai Wen	Men's sanda -56kg	A Roa (PHI); L 0–2	did not advance		
Chong Jian Hwa	Men's sanda -65kg	Truong (VIE); L 0–2	did not advance		

== Xiangqi ==
Men

Athlete	Event	Round 1	Round 2	Round 3	Round 4	Round 5	Round 6	Round 7	Final
Athlete	Event	Opposition Score	Opposition Score	Opposition Score	Opposition Score	Opposition Score	Opposition Score	Opposition Score	Rank
Tan Yu Huat	Standard Single	Kung Hok (CAM); W 1–0	A Woo (SGP); L 0–1	P Daruganon (THA); D 0.5–0.5	R Lokutarapol (THA); W 1–0	—N/a	Dat V Q (VIE); W 1–0	Lan D C (VIE); D 0.5–0.5	3rd place, bronze medalist(s)
Fang Sze Jie	Standard Single	Dat V Q (VIE); D 0.5–0.5	R Lokutarapol (THA); W 1–0	Kung Hok (CAM); W 1–0	Lan D C (VIE); D 0.5–0.5	A Woo (SGP); L 0–1	—N/a	C Heng (CAM); W 1–0	3rd place, bronze medalist(s)
Sim Yip How; Yeoh Thean Jern	Rapid Team	Panichkul / Danwirunhawanich (THA); W 2–1	Cambodia (CAM); W 2–1	Singapore (SGP); L 1–2	Vietnam (VIE); W 2-1	—N/a			2nd place, silver medalist(s)
Fang Sze Jie; Yeoh Thean Jern	Blitz Team	Huong Ngo / Yi Hao (SGP); L 0.5–1.5	Panichkul / Danwirunhawanich (THA); D 1–1	Hà Vân / Nhật Quang (VIE); L 0–2	Huong Ngo / Yi Hao (SGP); L 0–2	Panichkul / Danwirunhawanich (THA); W 0–2	Hà Vân / Nhật Quang (VIE); L 0–2	—N/a	3rd place, bronze medalist(s)

Women

Athlete	Event	Round 1	Round 2	Round 3	Round 4	Round 5	Round 6	Round 7	Final
Athlete	Event	Opposition Score	Opposition Score	Opposition Score	Opposition Score	Opposition Score	Opposition Score	Opposition Score	Rank
Thong Yu Xuan	Standard Single	Fiona (SGP); W 1–0	Huong Ngo (SGP); L 0–1	Thi K L (VIE); L 0–1	Jee (MAS); L 0–1	H Yến Nguyễn (VIE); L 0–1	N Srivachirawat (THA); W 1–0	S Promsirinimit (THA); W 1–0	
Jee Xin Ru	Standard Single	S Promsirinimit (THA); W 1–0	H Yến Nguyễn (VIE); D 0.5–0.5	N Srivachirawat (THA); W 1–0	Thong (MAS); W 1–0	Fiona (SGP); W 1–0	Huong Ngo (SGP); D 0.5–0.5	Thi K L (VIE); D 0.5–0.5	2nd place, silver medalist(s)
