= Pencak silat at the 2021 SEA Games =

- Venue: Bắc Từ Liêm District Sporting Hall
- Location: Hanoi, Vietnam
- Date: 10–16 May 2022

Pencak silat competitions at the 2021 SEA Games took place at Bắc Từ Liêm District Sporting Hall in Hanoi, Vietnam between 10 and 16 May 2022.

== Medal table ==
* Host nation (Vietnam)

Rank	Nation	Gold	Silver	Bronze	Total
1	Vietnam*	6	2	5	13
2	Singapore	4	3	4	11
3	Malaysia	2	3	9	14
4	Thailand	2	2	4	8
5	Indonesia	1	5	3	9
6	Philippines	1	0	2	3
7	Brunei	0	1	1	2
8	Laos	0	0	3	3
Totals (8 entries)		16	16	31	63

== Medalists ==
=== Seni (artistic) ===
Event	Gold	Silver	Bronze
Men's single	Iqbal Abdul Rahman; Singapore	Ilyas Sadara; Thailand	Luqman Laji; Malaysia
Men's single	Iqbal Abdul Rahman; Singapore	Ilyas Sadara; Thailand	Muhd Ali Saifullah Abdullah Md Suhaimi; Brunei
Women's single	Mary Francine Padios; Philippines	Puspa Arumsari; Indonesia	Poukky Salermbubpha; Laos
Women's single	Mary Francine Padios; Philippines	Puspa Arumsari; Indonesia	Vương Thị Bình; Vietnam
Men's double	Malaysia; Mohd Taqiyuddin Hamid; Sazzlan bin Yuga	Singapore; Muhammad Hazim; Muhammad Haziq	Thailand; Abdulkarim Yusoh; Khairulmahdi Yusoh
Men's double	Malaysia; Mohd Taqiyuddin Hamid; Sazzlan bin Yuga	Singapore; Muhammad Hazim; Muhammad Haziq	Vietnam; Trần Đức Danh; Lê Hồng Quân
Women's double	Indonesia; Ririn Rinasih; Riska Hermawan	Vietnam; Nguyễn Thị Thu Hà; Nguyễn Thị Huyền	Malaysia; Nur Syazreen Abdul Malik; Nor Hamizah Abu Hassan
Women's double	Indonesia; Ririn Rinasih; Riska Hermawan	Vietnam; Nguyễn Thị Thu Hà; Nguyễn Thị Huyền	Singapore; Nur Azlyana Binte Ismael; Sharifah Shazza Binte Samsuri
Men's team	Thailand; Sobri Cheni; Abdulkarim Koolee; Abdulrahim Sidek	Indonesia; Anggi Faisal Mubarok; Asep Yuldan Sani; Nunu Nugraha	Philippines; Jefferson Rhey Loon Abilay; James El Mayagma; Rick Rod Ortega Luarez
Men's team	Thailand; Sobri Cheni; Abdulkarim Koolee; Abdulrahim Sidek	Indonesia; Anggi Faisal Mubarok; Asep Yuldan Sani; Nunu Nugraha	Vietnam; Vũ Tiến Dũng; Lưu Văn Nam; Nguyễn Xuân Thành
Women's team	Vietnam; Nguyễn Thị Thu Hà; Nguyễn Thị Huyền; Vương Thị Bình	Brunei; Nur Wasiqah Aziemah; Norleyermah Haji Raya; Anisah Najihah Abdullah	Malaysia; Merrywati Manuil; Siti Nur Khairunnisa Hail; Fatin Ardani Zamri
Women's team	Vietnam; Nguyễn Thị Thu Hà; Nguyễn Thị Huyền; Vương Thị Bình	Brunei; Nur Wasiqah Aziemah; Norleyermah Haji Raya; Anisah Najihah Abdullah	Singapore; Iffah Batrisyia Binte Noh; Amirah Binte Sahrin; Nur Binte Ashikin

=== Tanding (match) ===
==== Men ====
Event	Gold	Silver	Bronze
Class B (50–55kg)	Muhammad Khairi Adib Azhar; Malaysia	Khoirudin Mustakim; Indonesia	Sabidee Salaeh; Thailand
Class B (50–55kg)	Muhammad Khairi Adib Azhar; Malaysia	Khoirudin Mustakim; Indonesia	Nguyễn Đình Tuấn; Vietnam
Class C (55–60kg)	Muhammad Hazim Bin Muhammad Yusli; Singapore	Muhamad Yachser Arafa; Indonesia	Chansamone Phomsopha; Laos
Class C (55–60kg)	Muhammad Hazim Bin Muhammad Yusli; Singapore	Muhamad Yachser Arafa; Indonesia	Mohamad Hazim Amzad; Malaysia
Class D (60–65kg)	Adilan Chemaeng; Thailand	Nguyễn Trung Phương Nam; Vietnam	Bouavanh Khounphengkeo; Laos
Class D (60–65kg)	Adilan Chemaeng; Thailand	Nguyễn Trung Phương Nam; Vietnam	Ahmad Atif Irsyad Ahmad Zahidi; Malaysia
Class F (70–75kg)	Trần Đình Nam; Vietnam	Abdul Raazaq Bin Abdul Rashid; Singapore	Alvin Tanilon Campos; Philippines
Class F (70–75kg)	Trần Đình Nam; Vietnam	Abdul Raazaq Bin Abdul Rashid; Singapore	Mohd Al-Jufferi Jamari; Malaysia
Class G (75–80kg)	Nguyễn Tấn Sang; Vietnam	Sheik Ferdous Bin Sheik Alau’ddin; Singapore	Mohd Fauzi Khalid; Malaysia
Class G (75–80kg)	Nguyễn Tấn Sang; Vietnam	Sheik Ferdous Bin Sheik Alau’ddin; Singapore	Suthat Bunchit; Thailand
Class H (80–85kg)	Nguyễn Duy Tuyến; Vietnam	Ronaldo Neno; Indonesia	Muhammad Syakir Bin Jeffry; Singapore
Class H (80–85kg)	Nguyễn Duy Tuyến; Vietnam	Ronaldo Neno; Indonesia	Mohammad Amiruddin Adzmi; Malaysia
Class J (90–95kg)	Sheik Farhan Bin Sheik Alau’ddin; Singapore	Saranon Glompan; Thailand	Firdhana Wahyu Putra; Indonesia
Class J (90–95kg)	Sheik Farhan Bin Sheik Alau’ddin; Singapore	Saranon Glompan; Thailand	Muhammad Robial Sobri; Malaysia
Open (95–110kg)	Lê Văn Toàn; Vietnam	Billage Anak Nakang; Malaysia	Tri Juwanda Samsul Bahar; Indonesia

==== Women ====
Event	Gold	Silver	Bronze
Class E (65–70kg)	Nurul Suhaila; Singapore	Siti Shazwana Ajak; Malaysia	Janejira Wankrue; Thailand
Class E (65–70kg)	Nurul Suhaila; Singapore	Siti Shazwana Ajak; Malaysia	Nguyễn Thị Cẩm Nhi; Vietnam
Class F (70–75kg)	Quàng Thị Thu Nghĩa; Vietnam	Siti Rahmah Mohamed Nasir; Malaysia	Rahmawati; Indonesia
Class F (70–75kg)	Quàng Thị Thu Nghĩa; Vietnam	Siti Rahmah Mohamed Nasir; Malaysia	Siti Khadijah Binti Mohamad Shahrem; Singapore
