= Brunei at the 2021 SEA Games =

Brunei at the 2021 Southeast Asian Games
- IOC code: BRU
- NOC: Brunei Darussalam National Olympic Council
- Website: www.bruneiolympic.org (in English)

in Hanoi, Vietnam 12–23 May 2022
- Competitors: 24 in 4 sports
- Flag bearer: Anisah Najihah (pencak silat)
- Medals Ranked 10th: Gold 1 Silver 1 Bronze 1 Total 3

Southeast Asian Games appearances (overview)
- 1977; 1979; 1981; 1983; 1985; 1987; 1989; 1991; 1993; 1995; 1997; 1999; 2001; 2003; 2005; 2007; 2009; 2011; 2013; 2015; 2017; 2019; 2021; 2023; 2025; 2027; 2029

Brunei participated in the 2021 Southeast Asian Games in Hanoi, Vietnam from 12 to 23 May 2022. The Brunei contingent consisted of 24 athletes, competing in 4 out 40 sports, making this country the smallest contingent.

== Medal summary ==
=== Medal by sport ===
Medals by sport
Sport	1st place, gold medalist(s)	2nd place, silver medalist(s)	3rd place, bronze medalist(s)	Total	Rank
Wushu	1	0	0	1	7
Pencak silat	0	1	1	2	7
Total	1	1	1	3	10

=== Medalists ===
Medal	Name	Sport	Event
Gold	Mohammad Adi Salihin	Wushu	Men's taolu nanquan
Silver	Nur Wasiqah Aziemah; Norleyermah Haji Raya; Anisah Najihah	Pencak silat	Women's team seni
Bronze	Muhd Ali Saifullah Abdullah Md Suhaimi	Pencak silat	Men's singles seni
