= Mohammad Adi Salihin =

Bruneian wushu athlete (born 2000)

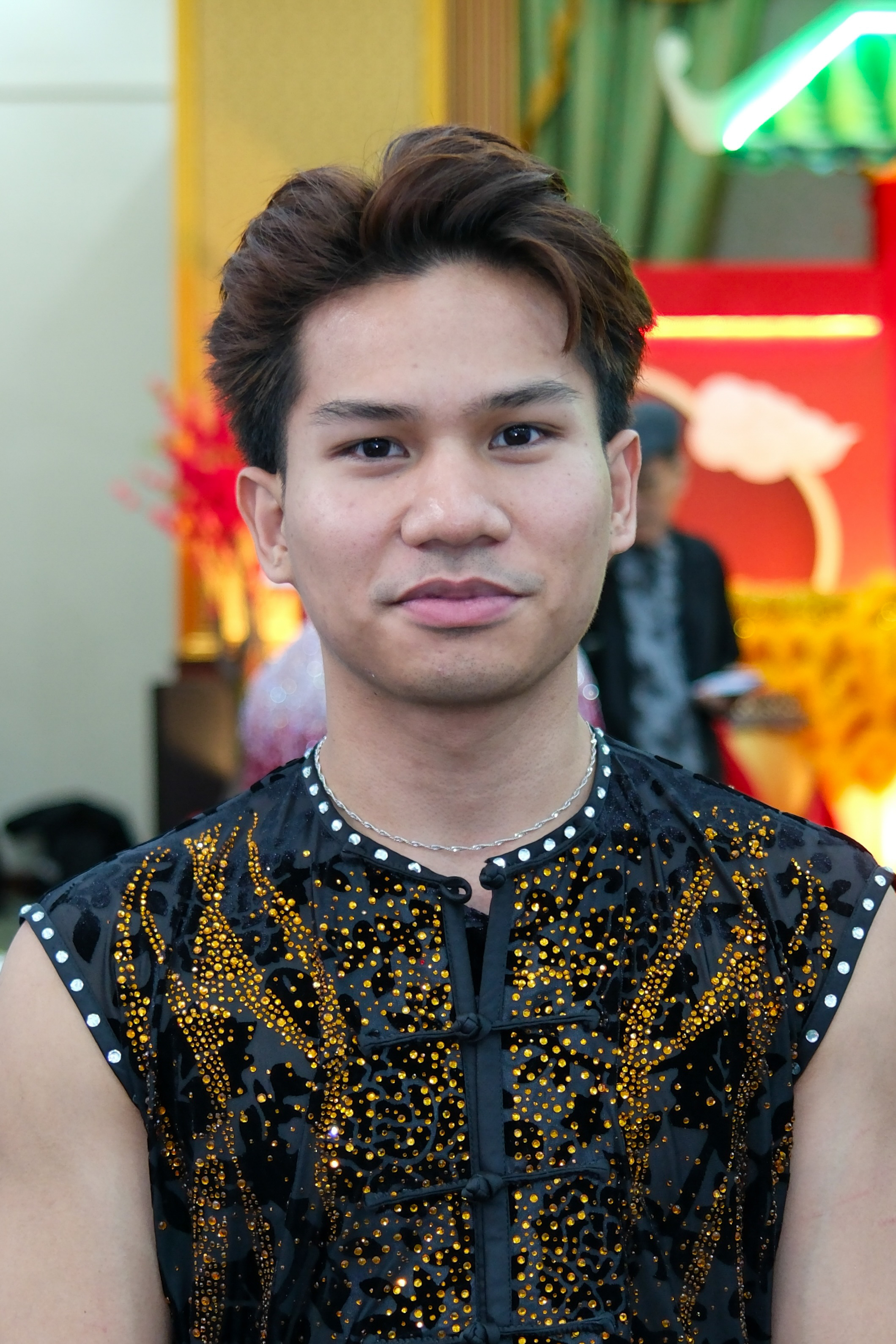
- Adi in 2026

Personal information
- Born: Mohammad Adi Salihin bin Roslan; 30 May 2000 (age 26) Brunei
- Occupations: Martial artist, athlete
- Height: 153 cm (5 ft 0 in)

Sport
- Sport: Wushu
- Events: Nanquan, Nangun and Nandao
- Team: Brunei Wushu Team
- Coached by: Li Hui
Medal record
Men's Wushu Taolu
Representing Brunei
World Games
| Silver medal – second place | 2025 Chengdu | Nanquan/Nangun |
World Championships
| Bronze medal – third place | 2025 Brasília | Nangun |
Taolu World Cup
| Silver medal – second place | 2024 Yokohama | Nangun |
| Bronze medal – third place | 2024 Yokohama | Nandao |
Asian Cup
| Bronze medal – third place | 2025 Songyuan | Nanquan |
SEA Games
| Gold medal – first place | 2019 Philippines | Nandao/Nangun |
| Gold medal – first place | 2021 Vietnam | Nanquan |
| Gold medal – first place | 2023 Cambodia | Nanquan |
| Gold medal – first place | 2025 Thailand | Nanquan/Nandao/Nangun |
| Bronze medal – third place | 2015 Singapore | Duilian |
Sukma Games
| Silver medal – second place | 2018 Perak | Nanquan |
BIMP-EAGA Friendship Games
| Silver medal – second place | 2018 Bandar Seri Begawan | Nanquan/Nangun |

Mohammad Adi Salihin bin Roslan (born 30 May 2000) is a Bruneian wushu taolu athlete. He is the country's most decorated athlete at the SEA Games, having won gold medals four times.

== Career ==
Adi claimed that Jet Li movies encouraged him to start learning wushu at the age of six. He started full-time training when he was eleven years old. Regarding the popularity of the sport, he stated, "People like the colours and the movement – and there are many different events to appreciate. Everyone enjoys wushu because it's very nice to watch."

The manager said that winning an international tournament is always very encouraging, especially because one of the Roslan brothers is now competing well on the international scene with Muhammad Adi Salihin earning gold in the Pars Wushu Cup in Iran and silver at the Sukma Games last year.

Adi placed sixth in the men's duilian (with weapon), eleventh in the men's daoshu, and thirteenth in the men's changquan events at the 27th SEA Games in Naypyidaw. Later at the 28th SEA Games in Singapore, he ranked 3rd in the men's duilian (with weapon) and 8th in the men's daoshu events.

On 19 August 2017, in the evening, Adi led the Bruneian contingent as the flag bearer during the 29th SEA Games opening ceremony in Kuala Lumpur. Before leaving, he spoke proudly in an interview at Brunei International Airport, stating, "It is a privilege to carry Brunei’s national flag in the opening ceremony. This will be one of my proudest moments in my life as I will be carrying the flag of the nation in the ceremony." He placed 10th in men's nanquan, 14th in men's changquan, and 7th in men's nandao & nangun all-around and men's daoshu & gunshu all-around competitions.

In the 18th Asian Games held in Indonesia, he achieved 12th place in the men's nanquan & nangun all-around event.

At the 19th Sukma Games in Perak, on 12 September 2018, 18-year-old Adi won a silver medal in the men's nanquan competition, barely 0.04 points away from taking home the gold. He achieved a score of 9.50 points, with Negeri Sembilan taking the gold. Later on 9 December, he competed in the men's nanquan + nangun event at the 10th BIMP-EAGA Friendship Games in Bandar Seri Begawan, where he won the gold medal with a final score of 18.56.

In the 15th World Wushu Championships held in Shanghai, China, he secured the 5th place in the men's duilian, 9th place in the men's nandao, 18th place in the men's nanquan, and 28th place in the men's nangun events.

On 2 December 2019, Adi completed the podium in the men's nandao/nangun combination event, ending Brunei's six-year drought for a gold medal at the 30th SEA Games. With a steady performance that saw her score 9.64 points in both the nandao and nangun events, Adi won the gold. This was Brunei's first gold medal since the women's duilian event in Myanmar in 2013, won by Faustina Woo Wai Sii and Lee Ying Shi. At the World Trade Center Metro Manila in Manila, Vietnam won bronze, and Indonesia came in second.

After winning gold in the men's nanquan event at the 31st SEA Games on 14 May 2022, Adi said, "Never stop to make the country proud. Brunei Yakin!" Adi outscored nine other candidates with a score of 9.71 points, guaranteeing that the Brunei national anthem will be sung in the Cau Giay Gymnasium in Hanoi, Vietnam. It was Brunei's first gold medal at the 31st SEA Games, and same athlete had broken Brunei's six-year drought for gold in the regional sports competition during the 30th SEA Games in the Philippines in 2019.

At the International Pars Cup Wushu Championships in Iran, Adi made Brunei proud by taking home two gold medals in the nanquan and nandao events, as well as a bronze in the nangun event. A total of 163 athletes from 14 nations competed in the tournament, which took place from 14 to 17 April 2023. Brunei placed third overall. He was the sole participant from Brunei taking part in the competition that year.

At the 32nd SEA Games, Adi accomplished an incredible accomplishment once more, winning Brunei's first gold medal. On 10 May 2023, he won the men's nanquan event, earning a gold medal for the third time in a row and securing his place as the country's most decorated athlete. He outscored eleven opponents in the Chroy Changvar Convention Centre in Phnom Penh with a score of 9.636.

Adi was chosen to represent Brunei as the 19th Asian Games flag bearer, together with wushu athlete Basma Lachkar. He came dangerously close to finishing on the podium in the competition on 26 September 2023. With a total of 19.429 points, he placed fourth in the men's nanquan and nangun all-around event. After the nanquan competition in the morning at the Xiaoshan Gaoli Sports Centre, he finished sixth with a total of 19.143 points.

Adi participated in the 16th World Wushu Championships in November 2023, which were hosted in Fort Worth, Texas. He placed fourth in the men's nandao and fifth in the men's nangun.

== Personal life ==
Adi's three brothers, Mohammad Adi Sya'rani, Md. Sufi Shayiran and Md Safiee Shayfiran are also national wushu athletes.

== Honours and recognitions ==
On 17 February 2019, Adi received the Bruneian government's Sports Excellence Promotion Scheme (SPKS) in recognition of his achievement in the 30th SEA Games.

The 30th SEA Games medallists from Brunei took home a total of $76,100 in the Hassanal Bolkiah Indoor Stadium on 17 February 2020, thanks to the government's Sports Excellence Incentive Scheme. Adi got $10,000 for winning the gold in the men's combined nandao and nangun events. Additionally, for his performance at the same and previous competitions, spending 14 years practicing wushu, and motivating young athletes, he has raised Brunei's profile internationally. As a result, on 7 August 2021, during the 16th National Youth Day celebration, Sultan Hassanal Bolkiah awarded him the Excellent Youth Award 2020.
