= Archery at the 2021 SEA Games =

- Venue: Hanoi Sports Training and Competition Centre
- Location: Hanoi, Vietnam
- Dates: 15–19 May 2022

The archery events at the 2021 SEA Games took place at Hanoi Sports Training and Competition Centre in Hanoi, Vietnam from 15 to 19 May 2022.

== Participating nations ==
- Indonesia
- Malaysia
- Myanmar
- Laos
- Philippines
- Singapore
- Thailand
- Vietnam (host)

== Medal table ==
* Host nation (Vietnam)

| Rank | Nation | Gold | Silver | Bronze | Total |
|---|---|---|---|---|---|
| 1 | Indonesia | 5 | 1 | 0 | 6 |
| 2 | Malaysia | 2 | 2 | 5 | 9 |
| 3 | Thailand | 1 | 2 | 1 | 4 |
| 4 | Philippines | 1 | 1 | 1 | 3 |
| 5 | Singapore | 1 | 0 | 1 | 2 |
| 6 | Vietnam* | 0 | 4 | 1 | 5 |
| 7 | Myanmar | 0 | 0 | 1 | 1 |
| Totals (7 entries) | | 10 | 10 | 10 | 30 |

== Medalists ==
=== Recurve ===
| Event | Gold | Silver | Bronze |
|---|---|---|---|
| Men's individual | Arif Dwi Pangestu; Indonesia | Riau Ega Agatha; Indonesia | Khairul Anuar Mohamad; Malaysia |
| Women's individual | Rezza Octavia; Indonesia | Narisara Khunhiranchaiyo; Thailand | Syaqiera Mashayikh; Malaysia |
| Men's team | Indonesia; Alviyanto Prastyadi; Arif Dwi Pangestu; Riau Ega Agatha | Vietnam; Chu Đức Anh; Nông Văn Linh; Nguyễn Duy | Malaysia; Bryson Ting Tiew Luing; Khairul Anuar Mohamad; Muhamad Zarif Syahir Zolkepeli |
| Women's team | Philippines; Pia Elizabeth Angel Bidaure; Phoebe Nicole Amistoso; Gabrielle Monica Bidaure | Vietnam; Hà Thị Ngọc; Đỗ Thị Ánh Nguyệt; Nguyễn Thị Thanh Nhi | Myanmar; Ya Min Thu; Pyae Sone Hnin; Thidar Nwe |
| Mixed team | Indonesia; Riau Ega Agatha; Rezza Octavia | Malaysia; Khairul Anuar Mohamad; Syaqiera Mashayikh | Vietnam; Nông Văn Linh; Đỗ Thị Ánh Nguyệt |

=== Compound ===
| Event | Gold | Silver | Bronze |
|---|---|---|---|
| Men's individual | Mohd Juwaidi Mazuki; Malaysia | Sirapop Chainak; Thailand | Alang Ariff Aqil M. Ghazali; Malaysia |
| Women's individual | Contessa Loh Tze Chieh; Singapore | Lê Phương Thảo; Vietnam | Madeleine Ong Xue Li; Singapore |
| Men's team | Indonesia; Prima Wisnu Wardhana; Hendika Putra Pratama; Deki Hastian Adika | Malaysia; Mohd Juwaidi Mazuki; Wong Co Wan; Alang Ariff Aqil M. Ghazali | Philippines; Paul Marton de la Cruz; Florante Matan; Andrei Johann Olaño |
| Women's team | Thailand; Kodchaporn Pratumsuwan; Kanoknapus Kaewchomphu; Kanyavee Maneesombatkul | Vietnam; Nguyễn Thị Hải Châu; Lê Phạm Ngọc Anh; Lê Phương Thảo | Malaysia; Fatin Nurfatehah Mat Salleh; Iman Aisyah Norazam; Kayalvhily |
| Mixed team | Malaysia; Mohd Juwaidi Mazuki; Fatin Nurfatehah Mat Salleh | Philippines; Jennifer Dy Chan; Paul Marton de la Cruz | Thailand; Kanyavee Maneesombatkul; Sirapop Chainak |
