= Seri Mulia Sarjana School =

Coordinates: 4.9007°N 114.9004°E

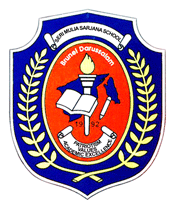

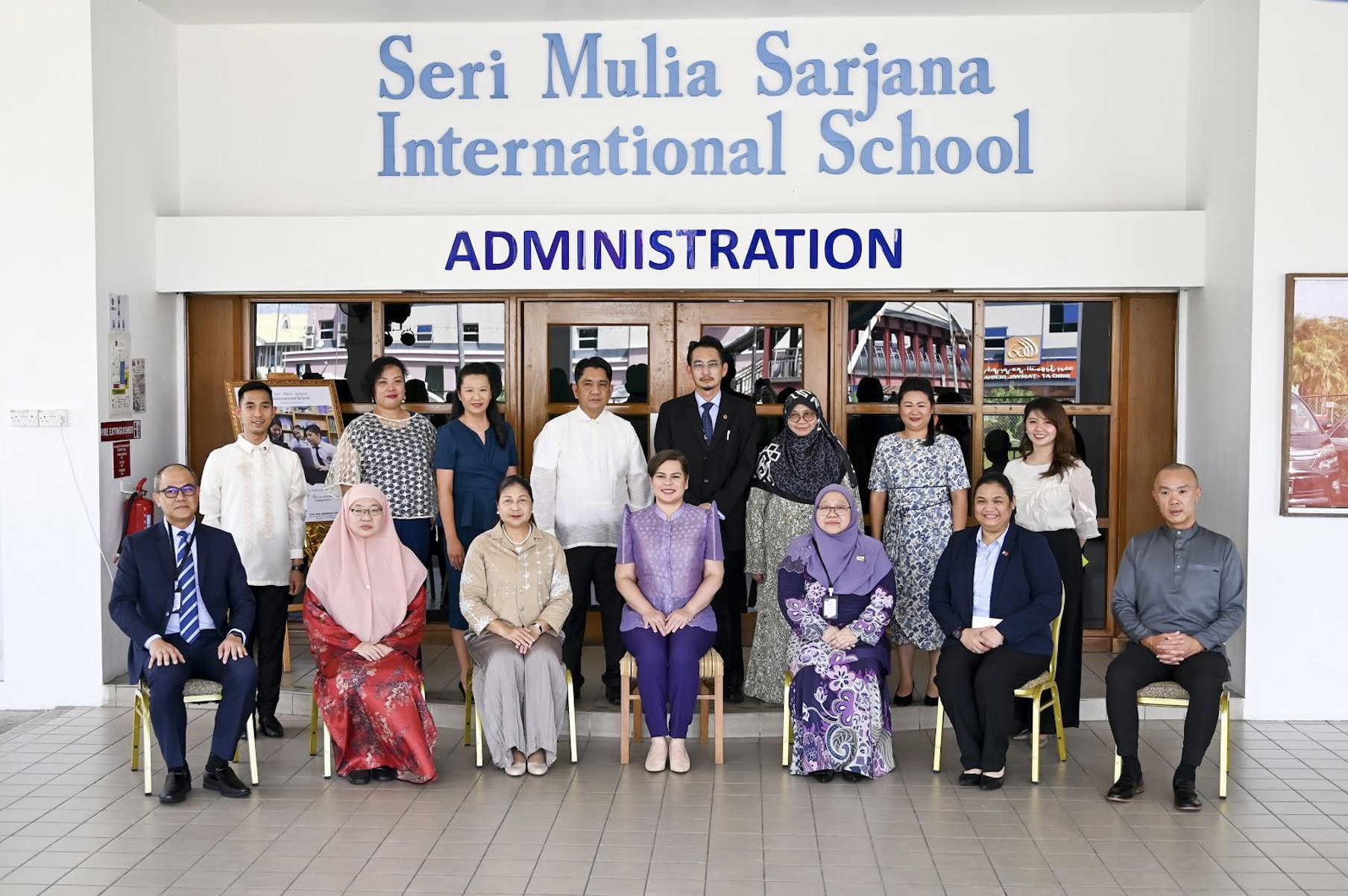
- Kampong Mata-Mata and Kampong Jangsak, Bandar Seri Begawan; Brunei

Information
- Former name: PDS School
- Type: Private
- Founded: 13 January 1992; 34 years ago
- Founder: Mary Lim
- Principal: Mary Lim
- Website: smsarjana.edu.bn

Seri Mulia Sarjana School , formerly known as PDS School , known in the Malay language as Sekolah Seri Mulia Sarjana and abbreviated as SMSS, is located in the Brunei-Muara District of Brunei. It was founded on 13 January 1992.

== History ==
Originally a preschool with 14 students, it has grown to include the Primary Levels and has enrolled 1000 students in five years.

Today it caters for over 2,000 students and is among the five private schools nationwide offering Secondary Level Education. It has expanded to three locations, each catering to a curricular level. It is also the youngest private school to have been granted a Secondary Section in Brunei Darussalam.

== The logo ==
- Blue symbolizes the peace and nobility of Negara Brunei Darussalam
- Red symbolizes ambition and the zeal to excel
- White symbolizes the innocence of youth and purity of soul
- The Book and Pen symbolize learning and acquisition of knowledge
- Yellow Leaves connote the leadership quality that the school would like to develop in her students (i.e. in accordance to the principles of "Melayu Islam Beraja") and His Majesty's Government
- The Torch epitomizes the aim of the school in giving her students a bright future with the power of knowledge and sound moral values.

== Notable alumni ==
- Nur Wasiqah Aziemah, national pencak silat practitioner
