= Wushu at the 2021 SEA Games =

- Venue: Cầu Giấy District Sporting Hall
- Location: Hanoi, Vietnam
- Dates: 13–15 May

Wushu events at the 2021 SEA Games took place at Cầu Giấy District Sporting Hall in Hanoi, Vietnam from 13 to 15 May 2022.

== Medal table ==
* Host nation (Vietnam)

Rank	Nation	Gold	Silver	Bronze	Total
1	Vietnam*	10	3	7	20
2	Indonesia	3	9	3	15
3	Singapore	2	3	1	6
4	Philippines	2	2	5	9
5	Malaysia	2	1	2	5
6	Myanmar	1	2	2	5
7	Brunei	1	0	0	1
8	Thailand	0	1	2	3
9	Cambodia	0	0	3	3
9	Laos	0	0	3	3
Totals (10 entries)		21	21	28	70

== Medalists ==
=== Men's taolu ===
Event	Gold	Silver	Bronze
Changquan	Clement Ting; Malaysia	Jowen Lim; Singapore	Seraf Naro Siregar; Indonesia
Daoshu / Gunshu	Seraf Naro Siregar; Indonesia	Jowen Lim; Singapore	Wai Kin Yeap; Malaysia
Nanquan	Mohammad Adi Salihin; Brunei	Harris Horatius; Indonesia	Nông Văn Hữu; Vietnam
Nandao	Phạm Quốc Khánh; Vietnam	Calvin Lee; Malaysia	Nông Văn Hữu; Vietnam
Nangun	Thein Than Oo; Myanmar	Phạm Quốc Khánh; Vietnam	Harris Horatius; Indonesia
Taijiquan	Tan Zhi Yan; Malaysia	Jones Llabres Inso; Philippines	Chan Jun Kai; Singapore
Taijijian	Chan Jun Kai; Singapore	Nicholas; Indonesia	Jones Llabres Inso; Philippines

=== Men's sanda ===
Event	Gold	Silver	Bronze
56 kg	Arnel Mandal; Philippines	Laksmana Pandu Pratama; Indonesia	Sametrampekeo Mom; Cambodia
56 kg	Arnel Mandal; Philippines	Laksmana Pandu Pratama; Indonesia	Thongchai Huanak; Thailand
60 kg	Bùi Trường Giang; Vietnam	Jumanta; Indonesia	Muychantharith Mao; Cambodia
60 kg	Bùi Trường Giang; Vietnam	Jumanta; Indonesia	Gideon Fred Padua Wayan; Philippines
65 kg	Trương Văn Chưởng; Vietnam	Charwat Khunphet; Thailand	Kingphet Onephim; Laos
65 kg	Trương Văn Chưởng; Vietnam	Charwat Khunphet; Thailand	Francisco Solis Alo; Philippines
70 kg	Nguyễn Văn Tài; Vietnam	Puja Riyaya; Indonesia	Myo Min Htet; Myanmar
70 kg	Nguyễn Văn Tài; Vietnam	Puja Riyaya; Indonesia	Clement Tabugara Pabatang Jr; Philippines

=== Women's taolu ===
Event	Gold	Silver	Bronze
Changquan	Hoàng Thị Phương Giang; Vietnam	Nandhira Mauriskha; Indonesia	Dương Thúy Vi; Vietnam
Daoshu / Gunshu	Kimberly Ong; Singapore	Zoe Tan Ziyi; Singapore	Hoàng Thị Phương Giang; Vietnam
Jianshu	Dương Thúy Vi; Vietnam	Nandhira Mauriskha; Indonesia	Đặng Tiểu Bình; Vietnam
Qiangshu	Dương Thúy Vi; Vietnam	Sandi Oo; Myanmar	Đặng Tiểu Bình; Vietnam
Taijiquan	Alisya Mellynar; Indonesia	Agatha Wong; Philippines	Sydney Chin; Malaysia
Taijijian	Agatha Wong; Philippines	Trần Thị Minh Huyền; Vietnam	Trần Thị Kiều Trang; Vietnam

=== Women's sanda ===
Event	Gold	Silver	Bronze
48 kg	Junita Malau; Indonesia	Nguyễn Thị Chinh; Vietnam	Divine Wally Masadao; Philippines
48 kg	Junita Malau; Indonesia	Nguyễn Thị Chinh; Vietnam	Jantakarn Manoban; Thailand
52 kg	Ngô Thị Phương Nga; Vietnam	Rosalina Simanjuntak; Indonesia	Dany Phatt; Cambodia
52 kg	Ngô Thị Phương Nga; Vietnam	Rosalina Simanjuntak; Indonesia	Cherry Than; Myanmar
56 kg	Nguyễn Thị Thu Thuỷ; Vietnam	Melisa Try Andani; Indonesia	Minavanh Oupaxa; Laos
60 kg	Nguyễn Thị Trang; Vietnam	Su Hlaing Win; Myanmar	Thania Kusumaningtyas; Indonesia
60 kg	Nguyễn Thị Trang; Vietnam	Su Hlaing Win; Myanmar	Khammai Lathsavong; Laos

== Results ==
=== Men sanda ===
56 kg

Semifinals		Final
(Thailand) Thongchai Huanak	1
(Philippines) Arnel Mandal Roa	2	(Philippines) Arnel Mandal Roa	2
(Cambodia) Sametrampekeo Mom	0	(Indonesia) Laksmana Pandu Pratama	0
(Indonesia) Laksmana Pandu Pratama	1

60 kg

Semifinals		Final
(Cambodia) Muychantharith Mao	0
(Indonesia) Jumanta	1	(Indonesia) Jumanta	0
(Vietnam) Bùi Trường Giang	2	(Vietnam) Bùi Trường Giang	2
(Philippines) Gideon Fred Padua Wayan	0

65 kg

Semifinals		Final
(Laos) Kingphet Onephim	0
(Thailand) Charwat Khunphet	2	(Thailand) Charwat Khunphet	0
(Philippines) Francisco Solis Alo	0	(Vietnam) Trương Văn Chưởng	2
(Vietnam) Trương Văn Chưởng	2

70 kg

Semifinals		Final
(Myanmar) Myo Min Htet	0
(Indonesia) Puja Riyaya	2	(Indonesia) Puja Riyaya	0
(Philippines) Clement Tabugara Pabatang Jr	0	(Vietnam) Nguyễn Văn Tài	2
(Vietnam) Nguyễn Văn Tài	1

=== Women sanda ===
48 kg

Semifinals		Final
(Vietnam) Nguyễn Thị Chinh	2
(Philippines) Divine Wally Masadao	1	(Vietnam) Nguyễn Thị Chinh	w/o
(Indonesia) Junita Malau	2	(Indonesia) Junita Malau
(Thailand) Jantakarn Manoban	0

52 kg

Semifinals		Final
(Cambodia) Dany Phatt	0
(Indonesia) Rosalina Simanjuntak	2	(Indonesia) Rosalina Simanjuntak	0
(Vietnam) Ngô Thị Phương Nga	2	(Vietnam) Ngô Thị Phương Nga	2
(Myanmar) Cherry Than	0

56 kg

Semifinals	Final
(Indonesia) Melisa Try Andani
(Laos) Minavanh Oupaxa	(Indonesia) Melisa Try Andani	0
(Vietnam) Nguyễn Thị Thu Thuỷ	(Vietnam) Nguyễn Thị Thu Thuỷ	2
Bye

60 kg

Semifinals		Final
(Vietnam) Nguyễn Thị Trang	2
(Indonesia) Thania Kusumaningtyas	0	(Vietnam) Nguyễn Thị Trang	2
(Laos) Khammai Lathsavong	0	(Myanmar) Su Hlaing Win	1
(Myanmar) Su Hlaing Win	2
