= Xiangqi at the 2021 SEA Games =

- Venue: Legacy Yên Tử
- Location: Quảng Ninh, Vietnam
- Dates: 14–20 May 2022

Xiangqi made its debut appearance at the 2021 SEA Games which took place at Legacy Yên Tử in Quảng Ninh, Vietnam from 14 to 20 May 2022.

== Participating nations ==
- Cambodia
- Philippines
- Malaysia
- Singapore
- Thailand
- Vietnam (host)

== Medal table ==
* Host nation (Vietnam)

Rank	Nation	Gold	Silver	Bronze	Total
1	Vietnam*	3	1	1	5
2	Singapore	1	1	2	4
3	Malaysia	0	2	3	5
4	Thailand	0	0	1	1
Totals (4 entries)		4	4	7	15

== Medalists ==
Event	Gold	Silver	Bronze
Men's Standard Single	Alvin Woo Tsung Han; Singapore	Đặng Cửu Tùng Lân; Vietnam	Fang Sze Jie; Malaysia
Men's Standard Single	Alvin Woo Tsung Han; Singapore	Đặng Cửu Tùng Lân; Vietnam	Tan Yu Huat; Malaysia
Women's Standard Single	Lê Thị Kim Loan; Vietnam	Jee Xin Ru; Malaysia	Lan Huong Ngo; Singapore
Women's Standard Single	Lê Thị Kim Loan; Vietnam	Jee Xin Ru; Malaysia	Nguyễn Hoàng Yến; Vietnam
Men's Rapid Team	Vietnam; Lại Lý Huynh; Nguyễn Thành Bảo	Malaysia; Sim Yip How; Yeoh Thean Jern	Singapore; Alvin Woo Tsung Han; Low Yi Hao
Men's Rapid Team	Vietnam; Lại Lý Huynh; Nguyễn Thành Bảo	Malaysia; Sim Yip How; Yeoh Thean Jern	Thailand; Pairoj Panichkul; Tawee Danwirunhawanich
Men's Blitz Team	Vietnam; Hà Văn Tiến; Nguyễn Minh Nhật Quang	Singapore; Lan Huong Ngo; Low Yi Hao	Malaysia; Fang Sze Jie; Yeoh Thean Jern
