= Chess at the 2021 SEA Games =

Chess at the 2021 Southeast Asian Games
- Venue: Quảng Ninh Exhibition Palace of Urban Planning & Expo
- Location: Quảng Ninh, Vietnam
- Dates: 10–21 May 2022

Chess competition at the 2021 Southeast Asian Games took place at Quảng Ninh Exhibition Palace of Urban Planning & Expo in Quảng Ninh, Vietnam from 10 to 21 May 2022.

== Medal table ==
* Host nation (Vietnam)

Rank	Nation	Gold	Silver	Bronze	Total
1	Vietnam*	7	2	3	12
2	Indonesia	3	4	4	11
3	Philippines	0	2	3	5
3	Singapore	0	2	3	5
5	Malaysia	0	0	2	2
6	Thailand	0	0	1	1
Totals (6 entries)		10	10	16	36

== Medalists ==
=== Men's ===
Event	Gold	Silver	Bronze
Individual Standard	Nguyễn Ngọc Trường Sơn; Vietnam	Mohamad Ervan; Indonesia	Tin Jingyao; Singapore
Blitz	Lê Tuấn Minh; Vietnam	Lê Quang Liêm; Vietnam	Susanto Megaranto; Indonesia
Blitz	Lê Tuấn Minh; Vietnam	Lê Quang Liêm; Vietnam	Tin Jingyao; Singapore
Rapid	Nguyễn Ngọc Trường Sơn; Vietnam	Tin Jingyao; Singapore	Susanto Megaranto; Indonesia
Rapid	Nguyễn Ngọc Trường Sơn; Vietnam	Tin Jingyao; Singapore	Azarya Jodi Setyaki; Indonesia
Team Blitz	Vietnam; Lê Quang Liêm; Lê Tuấn Minh	Indonesia; Susanto Megaranto; Muhammad Lutfi Ali	Philippines; Daniel Quizon Maravilla; Jan Emmanuel Garcia Encarnacion
Team Rapid	Vietnam; Lê Quang Liêm; Trần Tuấn Minh	Philippines; Paulo Bersamina; Darwin Laylo	Indonesia; Novendra Priasmoro; Yoseph Theolifus Taher
Team Rapid	Vietnam; Lê Quang Liêm; Trần Tuấn Minh	Philippines; Paulo Bersamina; Darwin Laylo	Thailand; Thanadon Kulpruethanon; Tinnakrit Arunnuntapanich

=== Women's ===
Event	Gold	Silver	Bronze
Individual Standard	Dewi Ardhiani Anastasia Citra; Indonesia	Irene Kharisma Sukandar; Indonesia	Hoàng Thị Bảo Trâm; Vietnam
Blitz	Phạm Lê Thảo Nguyên; Vietnam	Chelsie Monica Ignesias Sihite; Indonesia	Janelle Mae Frayna; Philippines
Blitz	Phạm Lê Thảo Nguyên; Vietnam	Chelsie Monica Ignesias Sihite; Indonesia	Gong Qianyun; Singapore
Rapid	Phạm Lê Thảo Nguyên; Vietnam	Gong Qianyun; Singapore	Bạch Ngọc Thùy Dương; Vietnam
Rapid	Phạm Lê Thảo Nguyên; Vietnam	Gong Qianyun; Singapore	Jia Ru Sim; Malaysia
Team Blitz	Indonesia; Chelsie Monica Ignesias Sihite; Ummi Fisabilillah	Philippines; Janelle Mae Frayna; Shania Mae Mendoza	Malaysia; Puteri Rifqah Fahada Azhar; Puteri Munajjah Az-Zahraa Azhar
Team Blitz	Indonesia; Chelsie Monica Ignesias Sihite; Ummi Fisabilillah	Philippines; Janelle Mae Frayna; Shania Mae Mendoza	Vietnam; Phạm Lê Thảo Nguyên; Nguyễn Thị Mai Hưng
Team Rapid	Indonesia; Medina Warda Aulia; Ummi Fisabilillah	Vietnam; Phạm Lê Thảo Nguyên; Võ Thị Kim Phụng	Philippines; Janelle Mae Frayna; Marie Antoinette San Diego
