= Đỗ Thị Ánh Nguyệt =

Vietnamese archer (born 2001)

Personal information
- Nationality: Vietnamese
- Born: 15 January 2001 (age 25) Văn Lâm, Hưng Yên, Vietnam

Sport
- Sport: Archery
Medal record
Women's recurve archery
Representing Vietnam
SEA Games
Silver medal – second place	2021 Hanoi	Women's team
Bronze medal – third place	2021 Hanoi	Mixed team
Bronze medal – third place	2025 Bangkok	Women's team

Đỗ Thị Ánh Nguyệt (born 15 January 2001) is a Vietnamese archer. She competed in the women's individual event at the 2020 Summer Olympics. She was born in Văn Lâm, Hưng Yên.
