= Puteri Munajjah Az-Zahraa Azhar =

Malaysian chess player (born 2001)

Personal information
- Full name: Puteri Munajjah Az-Zahraa binti Azhar
- Born: 2001 (age 24–25)

Chess career
- Country: Malaysia
- Title: Woman International Master (2019)
- Peak rating: 2059 (February 2022)

Puteri Munajjah Az-Zahraa binti Azhar (born 2001) is a Malaysian chess player who holds the FIDE title of Woman International Master (2019), making her the third Malaysian to earn that title, after Audrey Wong Su Yi (1985) and Siti Zulaikha Foudzi (2006).

== Chess career ==
She won the girls Under 18 category at the 4th Eastern Asian Youth Chess Championship 2019 in Bangkok, scoring 7½/9, becoming the third Malaysian WIM.

She became first Malaysian women qualified for the Women's Chess World Cup 2021 in Sochi, Russia, where she was defeated 1½-½ by IM Ana Matnadze of Spain in the first round.

In 2022, she finished as joint runner-up in Marienbad Open, Czech Rep. with a score of 6.5/9. Later in the same year, she took part in the 'delayed' 2021 Southeast Asian Games in Vietnam, where Puteri Munajjah Az-Zahraa and her sister, Puteri Rifqah Fahada won a bronze medal for the Women’s Blitz Team event.

Former 2019 Malaysian Champion and six times Malaysian Schools (MSSM) Champion, Puteri Munajjah Az-Zahraa has shines much earlier in regional level youth championship in Asean+ Age Group 2011 held in Indonesia where she took home four Golds and two Silvers from the event.

She also represented Malaysian women's team in 43rd World Chess Olympiad 2018 in Batumi, Georgia, 44th World Chess Olympiad 2022 in Chennai, India and 45th World Chess Olympiad 2024 in Budapest, Hungary. No such event held in 2020 due to COVID-19 pandemic.

Then, she qualified again for the World Cup 2023 held in Baku Azerbaijan, but was defeated 1½-½ by IM Divya Deshmukh from India (Now she's GM). Again, in 2025 she qualified for World Cup 2025 held in Batumi, Georgia (https://womenscup2025.fide.com/tournament-tree/) but lost 0-2 to GM Stefanova, Antoaneta from Bulgaria. Despite of her defeat, she managed be making herself the first ever Malaysian chess player to qualify for three consecutive editions of the World Cup.
