= Anisah Najihah =

Bruneian pencak silat athlete (born 1997)

- Born: Anisah Najihah Abdullah; 4 February 1997 (age 29); Brunei
- Nationality: Bruneian
- Height: 155 cm (5 ft 1 in)
- Style: Pencak silat
- Trainer: Haji Khairul Bahrin

Other information
- University: Universiti Brunei Darussalam

Anisah Najihah Abdullah (born 4 February 1997) is a Bruneian pencak silat athlete.

== Early life and education ==
Anisah Najihah attended Universiti Brunei Darussalam and is the elder of two siblings. She played badminton, jogged, swam, and played netball before taking up pencak silat. She started swimming at the age of four and joined a swimming club at eleven due to her mother's insistence, despite her lack of interest. She looks up to seni tunggal (single) champions Puspa Arumsari from Indonesia and Nurzuhairah Yazid from Singapore as her role models.

== Career ==
After Anisah Najihah earned the nation's first gold medal in the seven years of the competition, Brunei recorded its best-ever result at the 7th ASEAN School Games, which came to an end on 27 November 2015. She won a gold medal in the women's single event, which took place at the Hassanal Bolkiah National Sports Complex's Multipurpose Hall. Through Anisah, Qistina Athirah, and Nurhamizah, the nation was also successful in winning bronze medals in the women's team event.

Anisah Najihah had to settle for fourth place with a score of 448 during the 9th BIMP-EAGA Friendship Games on 8 December 2016, missing out on bronze by a single point.

On 29 August 2018, at the Padepokan Taman Mini Indah Indonesia (TMII) in Jakarta, Anisah Najihah, Nur Azimatunnaemah Simat, and Qistina Athirah were just one point away from placing on the podium in the women's artistic team event of the 18th Asian Games. In the three-minute competition, the trio scored 447 points overall, one point less than fourth-place Singapore and one point ahead of fifth-place Thailand, who scored 448 points to earn bronze. The women's single event final of the 2018 Sukma Games took place on 19 September 2018, in Kuala Kangsar's Dewan Jubli Perak. She represented Brunei, placing sixth with 432 points.

On 7 December 2018, at the Youth Center, athletes from Brunei achieved podium placements in the pencak silat event of the 10th BIMP-EAGA Friendship Games 2018. In the women's single event, Anisah Najihah of team Brunei Darussalam 'A' won gold, followed by Yuniah Oktaviani of South Sulawesi in silver and Nurimah binti Ramlee of Sarawak in third. The women trio representatives, Nur Wasiqah Aziemah, Anisah Najihah, and Qistina Athirah Zainal, won a gold medal in the women's team event after scoring 459 points.

Anisah Najihah made her debut at the 2019 SEA Games memorable when she placed third out of eight participants in the women's single event, winning a bronze medal, in the Philippines on 3 December 2019. The 22-year-old won the bronze medal at the Subic Bay Exhibition and Convention Center with a score of 451 points.

Brunei's flag-bearer for the 2021 SEA Games in Hanoi, Vietnam was Anisah Najihah. Her national pencak silat team got off to a great start on 11 May 2022, taking home silver medals in the Bac Tu Liem Sporting Hall. In the women's artistic team event, Anisah Najihah, Norleyermah Raya, and Nur Wasiqah Aziemah secured the silver medal with a combined score of 9.915 points, while Vietnam secured the gold medal with a score of 9.965 points. She didn't realise she needed the procedure until she got back to Brunei and had an MRI on her right knee, where a meniscus tear was found. She underwent surgery on her right knee in September.

In the 2023 SEA Games, which took place in the Chroy Changvar Convention Centre in Cambodia, Norleyermah Raya and Anisah Najihah secured the silver medal with a combined score of 9.925 on 7 May 2023. The Bruneian team was defeated by the Singapore, who finished with 9.955 points. After competing, she had a second operation in Singapore and started her recovery in June 2023. A doctor in Brunei keeps an eye on her development because she is unable to go to Singapore for her monthly check-ups due to her operation. Her physiotherapists have been strict with her rehabilitation, pushing her to learn how to walk, bend her knees, and perform other basic activities.

== Honours and recognitions ==
On 28 June 2022, she received the Skim Penggalak Kecemerlangan Sukan, 'Sports Excellence Incentive Scheme' (SPKS) for her accomplishments in pencak silat at the 2021 SEA Games.

- Excellent Service Medal (PIKB; 12 June 2024)
