= Nurul Suhaila =

Singaporean pencak silat practitioner

Personal information
- Full name: Nurul Suhaila Binte Mohamed Saiful
- Nationality: (Singapore) Singaporean
- Born: 25 February 1995 (age 31) Singapore

Sport
- Country: Singapore
- Sport: Pencak Silat
Medal record
Women's pencak silat
Representing Singapore
Pencak World Championship
Gold medal – first place	2018 Singapore	Class D (60-65kg)
Silver medal – second place	2015 Phuket	Match Class D
Bronze medal – third place	2012 Chiang Rai	Match Class C (55-60kg)
Southeast Asian Games
Gold medal – first place	2021 Hanoi	Class E 65–70 kg
Bronze medal – third place	2015 Singapore	Class D 60–65 kg
Bronze medal – third place	2017 Kuala Lumpur	Class D 60–65 kg
Bronze medal – third place	2019 Philippines	Class B 50–55 kg
Asian Beach Games
Bronze medal – third place	2016 Vietnam	Class D 60–65 kg
South East Asian Pencak Silat Championship
Bronze medal – third place	2015 SEA Pencek Silat Championship	Class D

Nurul Suhaila Binte Mohamed Saiful (born 25 February 1995) is a Singaporean pencak silat practitioner. She represented Singapore at the Southeast Asian Games, the Asian Games and the Pencak World Championships. Nurul won her first world championship in 2018, at the 15th World Pencak Silat Championship.

== Career ==
Nurul Suhaila started getting interested in Silat when she watched her brother fight. She then decided to compete and prove that girls can fight just as well as the boys can.

Nurul Suhaila started Her Professional Career in Pencak silat at the 2013 Southeast Asian Games, but She was outmatched by Malaysian Pesilat Siti Zubaidah Che Omar at the Quarter Finals with a score of 5-0. An accomplished silat exponent, Nurul Suhaila clinched a bronze medal for her category (Class D, 60 to 65kg) at the 2015 Southeast Asian Games and also a gold medal at the Sijori Pencak Silat Championships in 2014.

Selly Andriani had denied Suhaila gold in the final of the 15th World Pencak Silat Championship, and defeated the Singaporean again in the semi-final of the same tournament the following year, which resulted in Suhaila getting a silver and bronze respectively. However, at the 18th World Pencak Silat Championship, Suhaila defeated two-time world champion, Selly Andriani 4-1 at the OCBC Arena to enter Class D (60-65kg) final. She faced Thailand's Janejira Wankrue and defeated the latter, and got her first world title.

In 2019, at the first United States Open Pencak Silat Championships in Sterling, Virginia, Singapore won 16 gold medals out of a possible 27. Suhaila, together with Sheik Ferdous and Iqbal Abdul Rahman, won gold in the tournament.

In Pencak silat at the 2019 Southeast Asian Games, Suhaila was defeated by Vietnamese Pesilat Tran Thi Them in the Semi-finals, resulting Her to achieve the bronze medal

Nurul Suhaila finally won Gold in Pencak silat at the 2021 Southeast Asian Games, after defeating Her Malaysian rival Siti Shazwana Ajak

However in Pencak silat at the 2023 Southeast Asian Games, Nurul Suhaila was defeated by Vietnam's Quang Thi Thu Ngia in the Semi-Finals, making Her won the Bronze

== Personal life ==
Nurul Suhaila has an older sister, Nurul Shafiqah Saiful, who is also a national pencak silat athlete.

Suhaila graduated from Ngee Ann Polytechnic with a diploma in mass communications.

Nurul is Muslim
