= Nur Wasiqah Aziemah =

Bruneian pencak silat athlete (born 2002)

- Born: Nur Wasiqah Aziemah binti Rosihan; 10 April 2002 (age 24); Brunei
- Nationality: Bruneian
- Style: Pencak silat

Other information
- University: Universiti Teknologi Brunei

Nur Wasiqah Aziemah binti Rosihan (born 10 April 2002) is a Bruneian pencak silat athlete.

== Early life and education ==
Nur Wasiqah Aziemah obtained her early education at Seri Mulia Sarjana School. She is a student at Universiti Teknologi Brunei (UTB) pursuing a BEng (Hons) in electrical and electronic engineering.

== Career ==
The Bruneian pencak silat team, made up of Nur Azimatunnaemah, Nur Wasiqah Aziemah, and Nur Qistina Athirah, competed in the women's artistic team event at the 2016 BIMP-EAGA Friendship Games held in Samarinda, Indonesia. The team won gold with a total score of 451. At the 2018 BIMP-EAGA Friendship Games at the Youth Center, Bandar Seri Begawan, Brunei's women trio representatives, Nur Wasiqah Aziemah, Anisah Najihah, and Qistina Athirah Zainal, won a gold medal in the women's team event after scoring 459 points.

On 30 March 2019, at the National Youth Pencak Silat Championship, held at the Hassanal Bolkiah National Sport Complex's Indoor Stadium, Nur Wasiqah Aziemah of Perguruan Panca Sukma became victorious in the women's single event. The three defeated Thailand in the round of eight in the 19th World Pencak Silat Championships 2022 in Melaka, Malaysia, but lost to Singapore in the semifinals. The three has only competed twice together, having won silver in the 31st SEA Games in Vietnam.

In October 2019, the team consisting of Nur Wasiqah Aziemah, Anisah Najihah, and Norleyermah Raya emerged victorious with a silver medal at the 8th Singapore Open Pencak Silat Championships.

The national pencak silat team of Brunei made an ideal beginning to the 2021 SEA Games on 11 May 2022, when they won silver medals in the Bac Tu Liem Sporting Hall in Hanoi, Vietnam. In the women's artistic team competition, the trio took home the silver medal.

At the Sarawak Premier International Silat Championship, which took place from 27 February to 5 March 2023, Nur Wasiqah Aziemah won the first medal in the women's single event. She defeated Siti Nazurah Mohd Yussoff of Singapore in the first round of her campaign, 9.910 to 9.885. She advanced to the final by defeating Zureen Zulyka Zaidel of Sarawak 9.915 to 8.885, earning her second triumph. She lost to Nur Syafiqah Hamzah of Malaysia 9.920 to 9.925, settling for the silver medal by a 0.005 difference.

In the women's artistic team competition at the 2023 SEA Games held at the Chroy Changvar International Convention and Exhibition Center in Phnom Penh, Cambodia, Brunei took home their first silver medal. After eliminating the Philippines' team in the semifinal, the women's pencak silat team, consisting of the same trio, advanced to the championship match. Against Singapore, the Brunei team scored 9.945 points against the Philippines' 9.910 points, putting them in the running for the gold medal. The decisive match was another close contest between Singapore and Brunei, with Singapore winning with 9.955 points while Brunei had 9.925 points.

== Honours and recognitions ==
Fitwellness BN increased its sponsorship of five athletes from the Elite Athlete Program, including Nur Wasiqah Aziemah. This happened after a multi-sport and heart rate sensor watch handing ceremony at the Youth Center in Bandar Seri Begawan on 11 September 2023.

- Excellent Service Medal (PIKB; 12 June 2024)
