= BIMP-EAGA Friendship Games =

- Frequency: Every 2 years
- Inaugurated: 25–27 April 1996 in General Santos, Mindanao, Philippines
- Most recent: 11–22 December 2018 in Brunei
- Next event: 1–5 December 2024 in Puerto Princesa, Palawan, Philippines

The BIMP-EAGA Friendship Games is a sporting biennial event between the regions of the four member countries of the BIMP-EAGA. The inaugural edition of the games took place in General Santos, Mindanao, Philippines from 25–27 April 1996.

== History ==
The former Philippine President Fidel V. Ramos proposed the said subregional economic co-operation initiative between the border areas of Brunei, Indonesia, Malaysia and the Philippines in order to accelerate the economic development between these countries. The planned cooperation came to fruition with the foundation of BIMP-EAGA on 24 March 1994. The first friendship game was inaugurated in General Santos, Philippines, on 25–27 April 1996. Subsequently, the second friendship games were held at Kuching, Sarawak, Malaysia in 24–26 October 1997. The friendship games was in hiatus for 5 years and only made a comeback in Puerto Princesa City, Palawan, Philippines on 23–26 April 2003.

== Participating countries ==
Nation / IOC Designation	Year Debuted	Urban Centres
Brunei (IOC designation: Brunei Darussalam)	1996	Bandar Seri Begawan
Indonesia	1996	Kalimantan: Balikpapan, Banjarmasin, Pontianak, Samarinda; Sulawesi: Bitung, Makassar, Manado, Pare-Pare; Maluku: Ternate; Papua: Jayapura, Manokwari
Malaysia	1996	Sabah: Kota Kinabalu, Lahad Datu, Sandakan, Tawau; Sarawak: Bintulu, Kuching, Miri, Sibu; Labuan
Philippines	1996	Mindanao: Davao City, General Santos, Zamboanga City, Cotabato City; Palawan: Puerto Princesa
Australia	2018	Northern Territory: Darwin

== Editions ==
Year	Games	Host city	Date	1st (gold)	2nd (gold)	3rd (gold)
1996	1	(Philippines) General Santos	25–27 April 1996	unknown	unknown	unknown
1997	2	(Malaysia) Kuching	24–26 October 1997	unknown	unknown	unknown
2003	3	(Philippines) Puerto Princesa	23–26 August 2003	Mindanao (21)	Sabah (11)	Palawan (9)
2004	4	(Malaysia) Kota Kinabalu	13–15 September 2004	Sabah (32)	Sarawak (15)	Mindanao (14)
2006	5	(Indonesia) Makassar	24–26 November 2006	Sabah (19)	South Sulawesi (16)	Papua (7)
2008	6	(Brunei) Bandar Seri Begawan	28–30 November 2008	Sabah (33)	South Sulawesi (13)	Brunei A (12)
2012	7	(Philippines) General Santos	8–11 December 2012	Sabah (32)	Sarawak (18)	Mindanao (11)
2014	8	(Malaysia) Labuan	6–11 December 2014	Sabah (14)	South Sulawesi (10)	Sarawak (8)
2016	9	(Indonesia) Samarinda	7–10 December 2016			
2018	10	(Brunei) Bandar Seri Begawan	7–9 December 2018	Sabah (23)	Brunei A (16)	Northern Territory (14)
2020	-	(Philippines) Davao City	Cancelled			
2024	11	(Philippines) Puerto Princesa City	1–5 December 2024			

== See also ==
- SEA Games
- ASEAN Para Games
- East Asian Games
- Asian Games
- ASEAN School Games
