= Handball at the 2021 SEA Games =

- Venue: 2 (in 2 host cities)
- Dates: 6–21 May 2022
- Nations: 4

The Handball tournaments at the 2021 SEA Games took place from 6 to 22 May 2022 in Vietnam. Indoor handball for men and women, and beach handball for men were contested.

Indoor handball returns to the SEA Games after it was last held in 2007. This is also the first time that indoor handball and beach handball events were held in the same edition.

A women's beach handball event was planned but was cancelled due to lack of entrant teams.

== Medal summary ==
=== Medal table ===
* Host nation (Vietnam)

Rank	Nation	Gold	Silver	Bronze	Total
1	Vietnam*	3	0	0	3
2	Thailand	0	2	1	3
3	Philippines	0	1	0	1
Totals (3 entries)		3	3	1	7

=== Medalist ===
Event	Gold	Silver	Bronze
Men's indoor	Vietnam; Nguyễn Văn Trọng; Vũ Chí Linh; Hồ Hoàng Dũng; Phạm Văn Quyền; Triệu Văn Long; Nguyễn Hoàng Thanh; Nguyễn Phúc Long; Trần Thiện Tâm; Liễu Gia Kiệt; Nguyễn Ngọc Hải Triều; Trần Lê Minh; Lữ Trần Toàn Phong; Nguyễn Văn Dần; Nguyễn Quang Đạt; Trần Xuân Nhạc; Hồ Trọng Quý	Thailand; Kasidech Itthiakarakul; Tuanmaitri Markmaitri; Tanakorn Ekchiaochan; Parinya Kanasa; Pongsaphatchai Doungsuwan; Phairoj Usuwan; Lapat Chootan; Wannapong Phumphio; Veerayuth Ngaphakwan; Samarn Sae-Lee; Sarawut Rungruangnara; Sitthipong Saneha; Atsawamethee Barameechuay; Kong Srathongdee; Kajonwit Saengsan; Kanin Deetalod	No bronze medals
Women's indoor	Vietnam; Nguyễn Thị Ánh Tuyết; Nguyễn Thanh Huyền; Mai Thị Trang; Đỗ Thị Như Quỳnh; Đàm Thị Khuyên; Hoàng Thị Lan Anh; Phạm Thị Loan; Đỗ Thị Liễu; Hoàng Thị Giang; Nguyễn Ngọc Thảo Vy; Võ Bé Tư; Nguyễn Thị Thanh Ngọc; Hà Thị Hạnh; Đàm Thị Thanh Huyền; Phùng Thị Linh Trang; Đỗ Thị Huyền Trang	Thailand; Nuttawadee Saisod; Siriyaporn Boonnet; Kamonwan Sripho; Preechaya Junmanee; Wanida Sopharak; Chanika Khamma; Natthawan Khropbuaban; Siraprapa Pakkavesa; Laksika Ieocharoen; Waruephat Supakorn; Jirarat Maiman; Jantima Promyaka; Mathurada Kaeoluan; Sunanta Hongbooddee; Wantanee Wichaisang; Thitima Sriratbuaphan	No bronze medals
Men's beach	Vietnam; Hoàng Văn Tiến; Huỳnh Kỹ; Huỳnh Nam Tiến; Kim Xuân Tiến; La Văn Lớn; Lê Văn Bình; Nguyễn Chí Tâm; Nguyễn Quang Tú; Nguyễn Văn Tùng; Võ Vương Trọng	Philippines; Van Jacob Baccay; Mark Dubouzet; Andrew Michael Harris; Manuel Lasangue Jr. Jamael Pangandaman; John Michael Pasco; Rey Joshua Tabuzo; Josef Valdez; Dhane Varela; Daryoush Zandi	Thailand; Open Kannarong; Nutdanai Ruksawong; Kittipong Ruksawong; Chokchai Saitaphap; Chaiwat Sinsuwan; Puwanart Srichai; Passakorn Srinamkham; Chainarong Srisong; Surasak Waenwiset; Saharis Buakham
