= Jujitsu at the 2021 SEA Games =

- Venue: Đan Phượng District Sporting Hall
- Location: Hanoi, Vietnam
- Dates: 14–15 May 2022

Jujitsu competitions at the 2021 SEA Games took place at Đan Phượng District Sporting Hall in Hanoi, Vietnam from 14 to 15 May 2022.

== Summary ==
During the official weigh-in for the 48 kg class in jujitsu, Jessa Khan, the defending champion and 2018 Asian Games gold medalist, was disqualified for being mere 240g over the weight limit. Under the rules of the Ju-Jitsu International Federation and the SEA Games Sports Technical Handbook, she would not be allowed to compete. The National Olympic Committee of Cambodia (NOCC) lodged a formal appeal with the event’s organising committee immediately after the weigh-in, asking that she be allowed to compete in the higher weight class of 62 kg. The appeal was later denied.

== Medal table ==
* Host nation (Vietnam)

Rank	Nation	Gold	Silver	Bronze	Total
1	Philippines	2	2	2	6
2	Vietnam*	2	1	2	5
3	Thailand	1	1	3	5
4	Singapore	1	1	1	3
5	Malaysia	0	1	1	2
6	Indonesia	0	0	2	2
7	Cambodia	0	0	1	1
Totals (7 entries)		6	6	12	24

== Medalists ==
=== Men ===
Event	Gold	Silver	Bronze
56 kg	Đào Hồng Sơn; Vietnam	Tang Yong Siang; Singapore	Komkrit Keadnin; Thailand
56 kg	Đào Hồng Sơn; Vietnam	Tang Yong Siang; Singapore	Jan Vincent Cortez; Philippines
62 kg	Suwijak Kuntong; Thailand	Carlo Angelo Peña; Philippines	Sunardi Muliawan; Indonesia
62 kg	Suwijak Kuntong; Thailand	Carlo Angelo Peña; Philippines	Cấn Văn Thắng; Vietnam
69 kg	Noah Lim; Singapore	Adam Akasyah; Malaysia	Muhamad Nurul Fikri; Indonesia
69 kg	Noah Lim; Singapore	Adam Akasyah; Malaysia	Marc Alexander Lim; Philippines

=== Women ===
Event	Gold	Silver	Bronze
45 kg	Phùng Thị Huệ; Vietnam	Jollirine Gonzalez Co; Philippines	Mab Sokhouy; Cambodia
45 kg	Phùng Thị Huệ; Vietnam	Jollirine Gonzalez Co; Philippines	Tadaporn Sakaew; Thailand
48 kg	Margarita Ochoa; Philippines	Dương Thị Thanh Minh; Vietnam	Kanjutha Phattaraboonsorn; Thailand
48 kg	Margarita Ochoa; Philippines	Dương Thị Thanh Minh; Vietnam	Bless Khoon Yin Yeap; Malaysia
62 kg	Annie Ramirez; Philippines	Orapa Senatham; Thailand	Fiona Toh; Singapore
62 kg	Annie Ramirez; Philippines	Orapa Senatham; Thailand	Nguyễn Ngọc Tú; Vietnam
