= Golf at the 2021 SEA Games =

- Venue: Heron Lake Golf Course
- Location: Vĩnh Phúc, Vietnam
- Date: 13–18 May 2022

Golf competitions at the 2021 SEA Games took place at Heron Lake Golf Course in Vĩnh Phúc, Vietnam from 13 to 18 May 2022.

== Medal table ==
* Host nation (Vietnam)

| Rank | Nation | Gold | Silver | Bronze | Total |
|---|---|---|---|---|---|
| 1 | Malaysia | 2 | 1 | 1 | 4 |
| 1 | Thailand | 2 | 1 | 1 | 4 |
| 3 | Indonesia | 0 | 1 | 1 | 2 |
| 4 | Singapore | 0 | 1 | 0 | 1 |
| 5 | Philippines | 0 | 0 | 1 | 1 |
| Totals (5 entries) | | 4 | 4 | 4 | 12 |

== Medalists ==
| Event | Gold | Silver | Bronze |
|---|---|---|---|
| Men's individual | Ervin Chang; Malaysia | Amadeus Christian Susanto; Indonesia | Weerawish Narkprachar; Thailand |
| Men's team | Malaysia; Ervin Chang; Rhaasrikanesh Kanavathi; Marcus Lim Pang Chuen | Thailand; Pongsapak Laopakdee; Weerawish Narkprachar; Ratchanon Chantananuwat | Indonesia; Naraajie Emerald Ramadhan Putra; Amadeus Christian Susanto; Randy Arbenata Mohamad Bintang |
| Women's individual | Natthakritta Vongtaveelap; Thailand | Aloysa Atienza; Singapore | Jeneath Wong; Malaysia |
| Women's team | Thailand; Natthakritta Vongtaveelap; Eila Galitsky | Malaysia; Jeneath Wong; Mirabel Ting Ern Hui | Philippines; Lois Kaye Go; Rianne Malixi; Maria Rafaela Singson |
