= Pétanque at the 2021 SEA Games =

- Venue: Pétanque Boulodrome
- Location: Hanoi, Vietnam
- Dates: 13–19 May 2022

Pétanque competitions at the 2021 SEA Games took place at Pétanque Boulodrome in Hanoi, Vietnam from 13 to 19 May 2021.

== Medal table ==
* Host nation (Vietnam)

Rank	Nation	Gold	Silver	Bronze	Total
1	Thailand	4	0	2	6
2	Cambodia	2	2	3	7
3	Vietnam*	1	3	3	7
4	Myanmar	1	0	2	3
5	Laos	0	2	4	6
6	Malaysia	0	1	2	3
Totals (6 entries)		8	8	16	32

== Medalists ==
=== Men ===
Event	Gold	Silver	Bronze
Doubles	Thailand; Ratchata Khamdee; Aekkarin Kaewla	Cambodia; Thong Chhoeun; Yim Sophorn	Vietnam; Nguyễn Văn Thành; Thạch Thanh Tuấn
Doubles	Thailand; Ratchata Khamdee; Aekkarin Kaewla	Cambodia; Thong Chhoeun; Yim Sophorn	Laos; Vilasack Lathsavong; Bountamy Southammavong
Triples	Thailand; Anuphon Phathan; Thanakorn Sangkaew; Thawonsith Ratchakot	Cambodia; Nhem Bora; Sieng Vanna; Khuon Lyhuor	Laos; Phoudthala Keokannika; Lar Mienmany; Xok Ananh Fongsanouvong
Triples	Thailand; Anuphon Phathan; Thanakorn Sangkaew; Thawonsith Ratchakot	Cambodia; Nhem Bora; Sieng Vanna; Khuon Lyhuor	Malaysia; Ayzek Hakimi Safingan; Muhammad Arif Kana; Mohamed Syahzwan Mohamed Sani
Shooting	Supan Thongphoo; Thailand	Nguyễn Văn Dũng; Vietnam	Sok Chanmean; Cambodia
Shooting	Supan Thongphoo; Thailand	Nguyễn Văn Dũng; Vietnam	Win Thurain Tun; Myanmar

=== Women ===
Event	Gold	Silver	Bronze
Doubles	Vietnam; Thái Thị Hồng Thoa; Trần Lê Lan Anh	Malaysia; Sharifah Aqilah Farhana; Nurashimah Senin	Cambodia; Heang Vichny; Nop Chourlyka
Doubles	Vietnam; Thái Thị Hồng Thoa; Trần Lê Lan Anh	Malaysia; Sharifah Aqilah Farhana; Nurashimah Senin	Laos; Noy Manythone; Noneny Phanthaly
Triples	Cambodia; Duong Dina; Sreng Sorakhim; Khoun Yary	Vietnam; Thạch Thị Ánh Lan; Nguyễn Thị Cẩm Duyên; Nguyễn Thị Lan	Laos; Anhsany Dalavanh; Khoun Souksavat; Aly Sengchanphet
Triples	Cambodia; Duong Dina; Sreng Sorakhim; Khoun Yary	Vietnam; Thạch Thị Ánh Lan; Nguyễn Thị Cẩm Duyên; Nguyễn Thị Lan	Thailand; Lalita Chiaochan; Aphinya Nuanwichit; Cheerawan Kallaya
Shooting	Khin Cherry Thet; Myanmar	Bovilak Thepphakan; Laos	Ouk Sreymom; Cambodia
Shooting	Khin Cherry Thet; Myanmar	Bovilak Thepphakan; Laos	Nguyễn Thị Hiền; Vietnam

=== Mixed ===
Event	Gold	Silver	Bronze
Doubles	Cambodia; Sin Vong; Vorng Chantha	Vietnam; Thạch Pha Nara; Nguyễn Văn Quang	Thailand; Sunitra Phuangyoo; Phongsakron Ainpu
Doubles	Cambodia; Sin Vong; Vorng Chantha	Vietnam; Thạch Pha Nara; Nguyễn Văn Quang	Malaysia; Sharifah Afiqah Farzana Syed Ali; Syed Afiq Fakhri Syed Ali
Triples	Thailand; Sudarat Tasorn; Nattaya Yoothong; Anupong Khamfu	Laos; Manivanh Souliya; Chansamone Vongsavath; Anoulack Veomany	Myanmar; Gant Gaw Thant Zin; Tin Tin Wai; Ko Ko Htwe
Triples	Thailand; Sudarat Tasorn; Nattaya Yoothong; Anupong Khamfu	Laos; Manivanh Souliya; Chansamone Vongsavath; Anoulack Veomany	Vietnam; Nguyễn Thị Thúy Kiều; Nguyễn Thị Thi; Lý Ngọc Tài
