= 2021 SEA Games =

Multi-sport event in Vietnam

XXXI Southeast Asian Games
- Host city: Hanoi and surrounding provinces, Vietnam
- Motto: For a Stronger Southeast Asia (Vietnamese: Vì một Đông Nam Á mạnh mẽ hơn)
- Nations: 11
- Athletes: 5,467
- Events: 523 in 40 sports
- Opening: 12 May 2022
- Closing: 23 May 2022
- Opened by: Nguyễn Xuân Phúc; President of Vietnam
- Closed by: Phạm Minh Chính; Prime Minister of Vietnam
- Athlete's Oath: Vũ Thành An
- Judge's Oath: Phan Thị Ngọc Linh
- Torch lighter: Quách Thị Lan
- Main venue: Mỹ Đình National Stadium (opening ceremony); Mỹ Đình Indoor Arena (closing ceremony)

The 2021 Southeast Asian Games (Vietnamese: Đại hội Thể thao Đông Nam Á 2021, lit. '2021 Southeast Asian Sport Assembly'), officially known as the 31st Southeast Asian Games, 31st SEA Games or SEA Games 31, and also stylized as Viet Nam 2021, were the 31st edition of the Southeast Asian Games, the biennial regional multi-sport event which was held in Hanoi, Vietnam and its surrounding provinces from 12 to 23 May 2022.

Originally planned to take place from 21 November to 2 December 2021, it was eventually rescheduled as a result of the COVID-19 pandemic in Vietnam. Featuring 523 events in 40 different sports, the majority of these sports were in the Olympic program, contrary to what had happened on the previous edition. This was the second time that Vietnam had hosted the games, having previously done so for the 2003 edition. The country had previously submitted a bid to host the 2018 Asian Games and won, but later withdrew due to financial constraints.

The host country Vietnam emerged in the medal tally as the overall champions for the first time in 19 years, recording 205 gold medals along with 125 silvers and 106 bronzes, accumulating 446 medals in total. They were followed by Thailand and Indonesia, with the Philippines and Singapore rounding out the top five.

== Host selection ==
=== Bids ===
Hanoi and Ho Chi Minh City both submitted bids to host the games. While Ho Chi Minh City was initially favoured, Hanoi is later deemed to be the more suitable location due to its existing sporting infrastructure. This came after the Vietnamese Prime Minister Nguyễn Tấn Dũng ordered provinces and cities to not build new sporting facilities as a cost-saving measure, following the country's withdrawal from hosting the 2018 Asian Games due to financial restraints.

==== Hanoi ====
According to Hanoi's submitted proposal to the Ministry of Culture, Sports and Tourism (MCST), the city would spend 1.7 trillion VND ($77 million) on preparing and organizing the 2-week games running from late November to December. 97 billion VND ($4.3 million) is expected to be earned back from broadcast rights, advertisements, sponsors and other contributions.

==== Ho Chi Minh City ====
In December 2017, Ho Chi Minh City Municipal Standing Committee of the Communist Party approved of the city's hosting proposal. According to the proposal, the direct cost for hosting the Games in the city is estimated to be 7.48 trillion VND ($330 million) with 6.6 trillion VND (US$290 million) to be spent on upgrading sports facilities and 904 billion VND ($40 million) on organizing costs. However, another 8.2 trillion VND ($360 million) is needed for the construction of Rach Chiec National Sports Complex while an athletes' village will not be built. The Games would run for 12 days in mid-August and see 30-36 sports being contested. The provinces of Đồng Nai and Bình Dương would also host a portion of Games.

=== Decision ===
In July 2018, Vietnam selected Hanoi as the host city for the 31st Southeast Asian Games (SEA Games 31) and the 11th ASEAN Para Games. Prime Minister Nguyen Xuan Phuc officially approved the decision in November 2019. SEA Games 31 would take place from November 21 to December 2, 2021, and the 11th ASEAN Para Games would take place in late December 2021. Vietnam Television (VTV) and the Voice of Vietnam (VOV) would broadcast live the Opening Ceremony, Closing Ceremony and the competition days.

== Postponement ==
SEA Games 31 was originally scheduled to be held from November 21 to December 2, 2021. However, on June 9, 2021, the Vietnam Olympic Committee proposed that the SEA Games 31 be held in July 2022 due to the increasing number of COVID-19 cases in the country. Myanmar and host Vietnam supported the proposal, while Laos was neutral, and Brunei, Cambodia, Indonesia, Malaysia, Thailand, Philippines, Singapore, and East Timor all opposed it. On June 24, during a virtual meeting of the Southeast Asian Games Federation (SEAGF), one of the proposals considered was to postpone the SEA Games 31 to April or May 2022.

On the afternoon of July 8, during the regular press conference of the Ministry of Foreign Affairs of Vietnam, spokesperson Le Thi Thu Hang confirmed that SEA Games 31 will be postponed to a more suitable time. This was also approved at the SEAGF virtual meeting with the Olympic Committees of the member countries held on the same day, and received the absolute support of the countries. In another development, the Government and the Politburo of the Central Committee of the Communist Party of Vietnam have agreed with the proposal of the Ministry of Culture, Sports and Tourism, the Organizing Committee of SEA Games 31 to postpone the organization of SEA Games to the second quarter of 2022, but will not host the 11th ASEAN Para Games in Hanoi.

The final decision was made in early November 2021, stating that the rescheduled SEA Games 31 will be held from May 12 to 23, 2022.

== Preparation ==
Vietnam's SEA Games Organizing Committee (SEAGOC) was formed in April 2020 with the function of preparing, submitting and executing plans to stage the Games.

=== Budget ===
The proposed budget allocated by the Vietnamese government for this edition of SEA Games was initially estimated to be 1.6 trillion VND (US$69.3 million). 980.3 billion VND (US$42.3 million) would be used for organizing costs while 602.3 billion VND (US$25.9 million) would be allocated for upgrades and repairs to facilities managed by MCST. Provincial authorities are responsible for renovations to facilities under their management. Other than a new cycling track in Hòa Bình Province and a small tennis complex on Hanoi Sports Training and Competition Centre campus (handled by Hanoi People's Committee), no other sporting venue would be constructed for this edition.

The organization revenue was expected to be 226.6 billion VND (US$9.7 million), with 136.6 billion VND coming from the delegates' accommodation fees and 65 billion VND from broadcast rights.

Due to the COVID-19 pandemic, Vietnam's budget for the Games was cut. In January 2022, the Vietnamese government approved an organizing budget of 750 billion VND (US$32.8 million) for the Games. On April 1, 2022, the Vietnamese government approved an additional budget of 449 billion VND (US$19.65 million) for the Games. The money was taken from the national budget for sports and physical training in 2022. Four ministries and central agencies were provided 378.3 billion VND, while Hanoi and 11 other provinces received an additional 70.7 billion VND.

=== Venues ===
Provinces that hosted the 2021 Southeast Asian Games

While Hanoi was the main hub, several other surrounding provinces assisted in hosting portions of the games. Athletes and officials were housed in hotels near their competition venues. In the initial plan, a new tennis complex was planned to be built on Hanoi Sports Training and Competition Centre campus and a supposedly-rebuilt Hàng Đẫy Stadium would host a group for men's football. Both of these projects faced development delays and difficulties and could no longer be completed in time for the games. Consequently, the tennis venue was relocated to a newly built private venue in Bắc Ninh Province, and Việt Trì Stadium hosted a men's football group alongside Thiên Trường Stadium during the group stage.

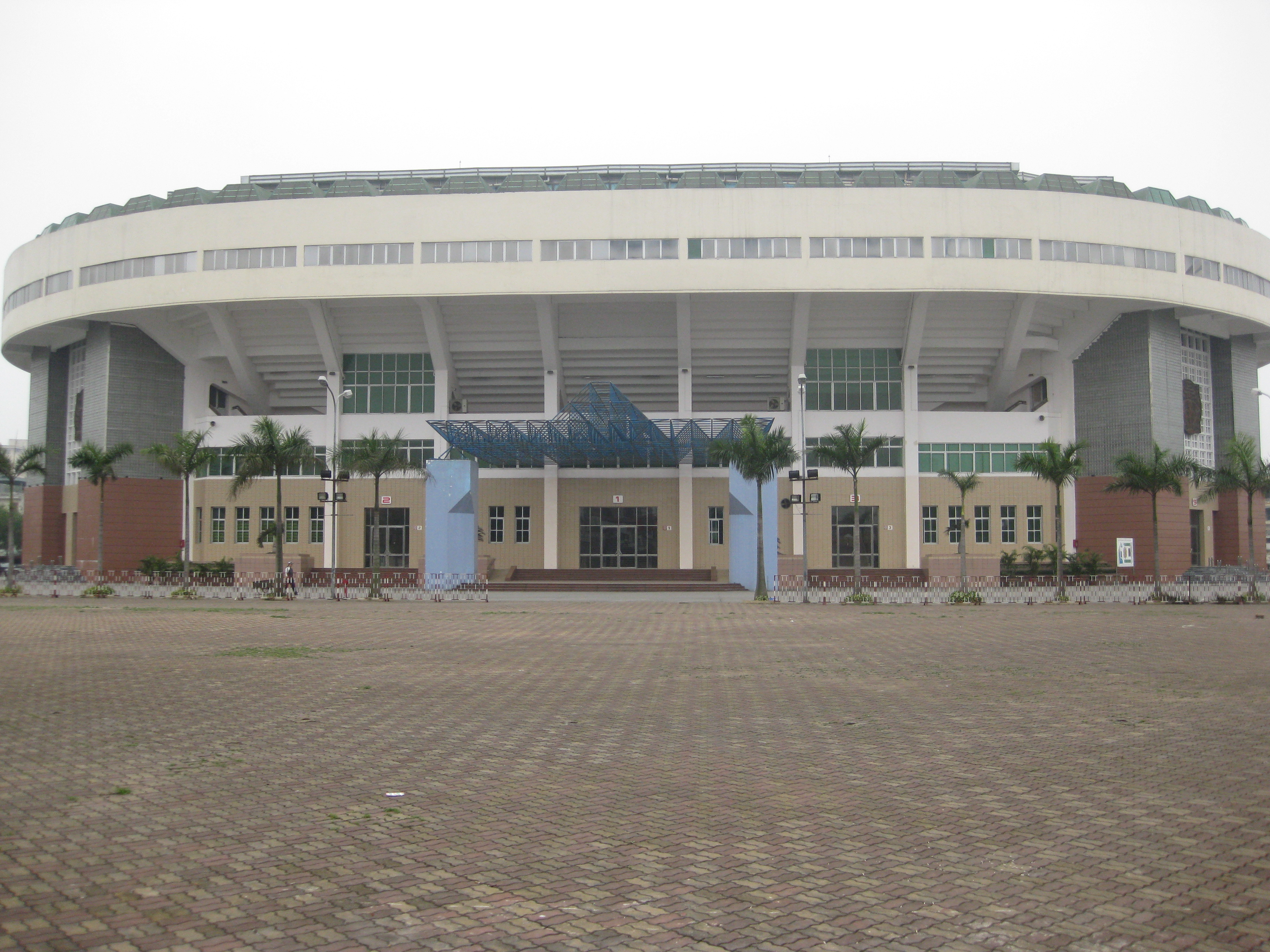
Quần Ngựa Sports Palace hosted all gymnastics events

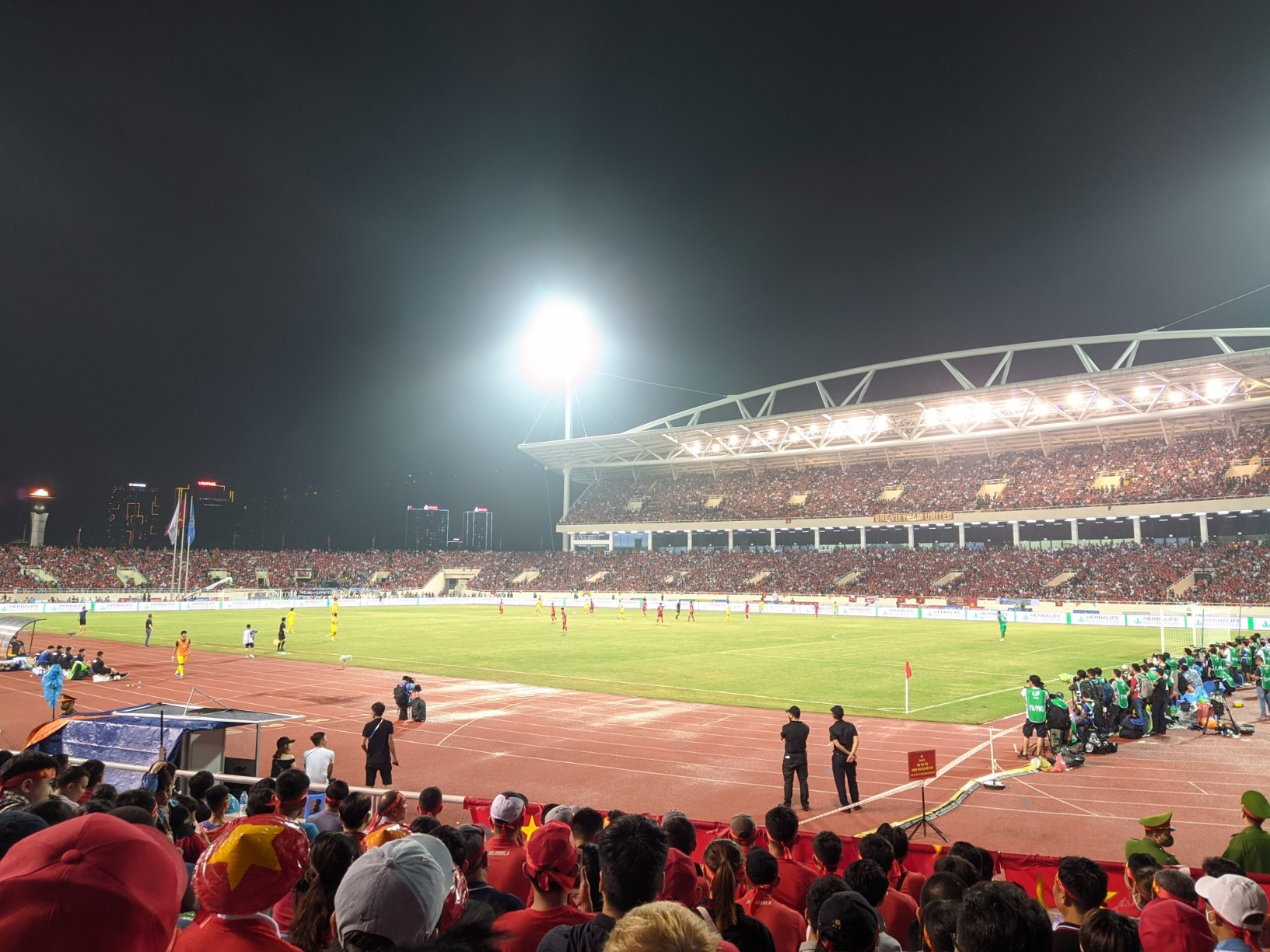
My Dinh National Stadium held the Opening Ceremony, the Male's Final football match and Athletics competitions

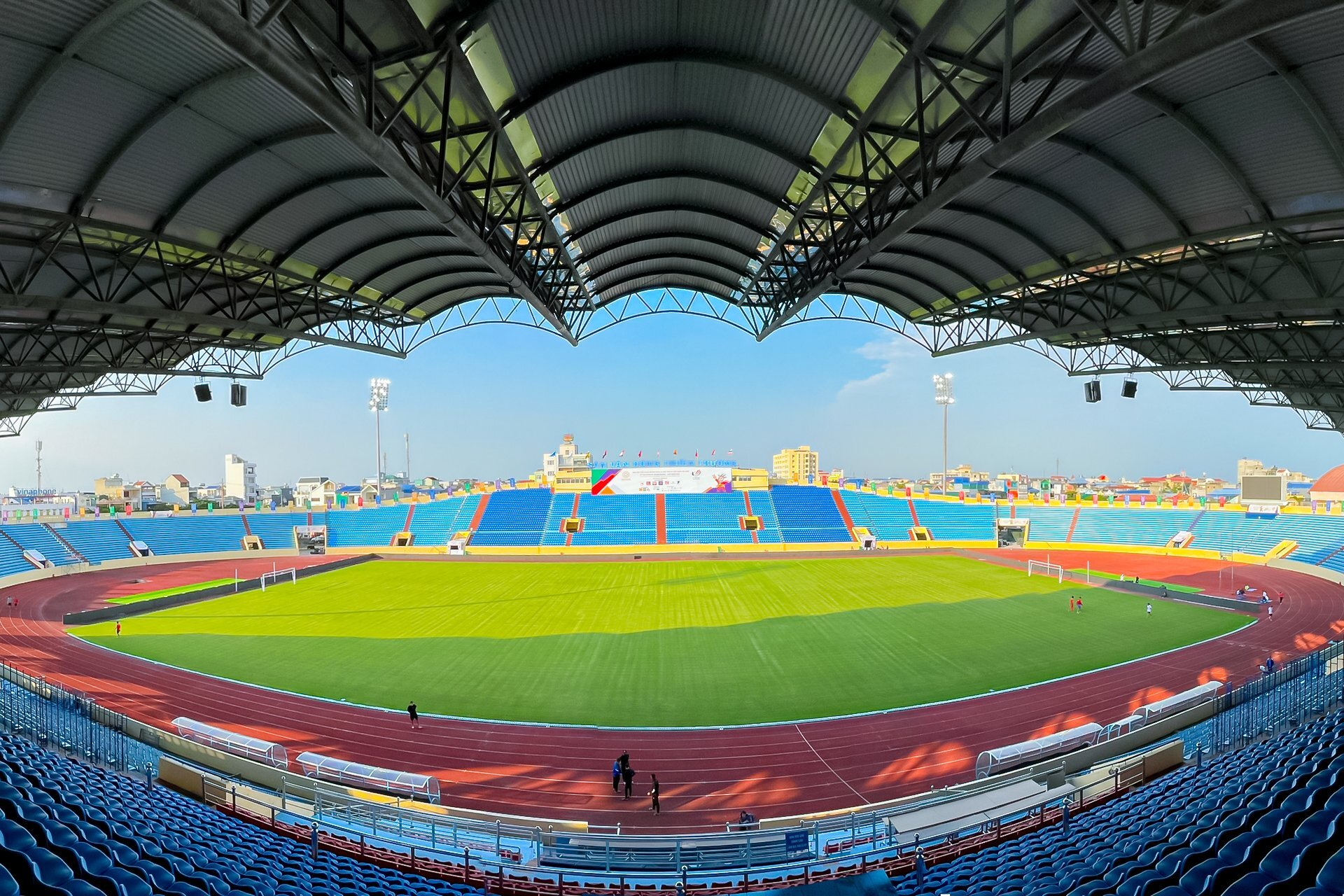
Thien Truong Stadium, held some football matches

Zone	City/Province	Venue	Event(s)	Capacity	Ref.
Hanoi Capital Region venues	Hanoi	National Sports Complex			
Hanoi Capital Region venues	Hanoi	Mỹ Đình National Stadium	Opening Ceremony, Men's Football Finals, Athletics	40,192	
Hanoi Capital Region venues	Hanoi	Mỹ Đình Aquatics Center	Aquatics, Finswimming	5,700	
Hanoi Capital Region venues	Hanoi	Hanoi Indoor Games Gymnasium	Fencing, Closing Ceremony	3,094	
Hanoi Capital Region venues	Hanoi	Hanoi Sports Training and Competition Centre			
Hanoi Capital Region venues	Hanoi	Palace of Culture	Weightlifting, Bodybuilding		
Hanoi Capital Region venues	Hanoi	Pétanque Boulodrome	Pétanque		
Hanoi Capital Region venues	Hanoi	Archery Field	Archery		
Hanoi Capital Region venues	Hanoi	Other			
Hanoi Capital Region venues	Hanoi	Bắc Từ Liêm District Sporting Hall	Pencak Silat	950	
Hanoi Capital Region venues	Hanoi	Cầu Giấy District Sporting Hall	Wushu	858	
Hanoi Capital Region venues	Hanoi	Đan Phượng District Sporting Hall	Jujitsu	525	
Hanoi Capital Region venues	Hanoi	Gia Lâm District Sporting Hall	Wrestling	2,400	
Hanoi Capital Region venues	Hanoi	Hà Đông District Sporting Hall	Billiards & Snooker	1,850	
Hanoi Capital Region venues	Hanoi	Hanoi National Sports Training Centre No. 1	Shooting		
Hanoi Capital Region venues	Hanoi	Hoài Đức District Sporting Hall	Judo, Kurash	2,000	
Hanoi Capital Region venues	Hanoi	Hoàng Mai District Sporting Hall	Sepak takraw	1,000	
Hanoi Capital Region venues	Hanoi	Long Biên District Sporting Hall	Dancesport	300	
Hanoi Capital Region venues	Hanoi	Quần Ngựa Sports Palace	Gymnastics	5,500	
Hanoi Capital Region venues	Hanoi	Royal City Hanoi	Bowling		
Hanoi Capital Region venues	Hanoi	Tây Hồ District Sporting Hall	Taekwondo	1,200	
Hanoi Capital Region venues	Hanoi	Thanh Trì District Sporting Hall	Basketball	1,086	
Hanoi Capital Region venues	Hanoi	Sóc Sơn District Sporting Hall	Vovinam	934	
Hanoi Capital Region venues	Hanoi	Vietnam National Convention Center	Esports	3,747	
Hanoi Capital Region venues	Bắc Giang	Bắc Giang Gymnasium	Badminton	4,000	
Hanoi Capital Region venues	Bắc Ninh	Bắc Ninh Gymnasium	Boxing, Kickboxing	3,000	
Hanoi Capital Region venues	Bắc Ninh	Bắc Ninh Sports University Gymnasium	Handball	1,500	
Hanoi Capital Region venues	Bắc Ninh	Hanaka Sports & Entertainment Center	Tennis	3,000	
Hanoi Capital Region venues	Hà Nam	Hà Nam Gymnasium	Futsal	7,500	
Hanoi Capital Region venues	Hải Dương	Hải Dương Sporting Hall	Table Tennis	2,300	
Hanoi Capital Region venues	Hòa Bình	—N/a	Cycling		
Hanoi Capital Region venues	Vĩnh Phúc	Vĩnh Phúc Sporting Hall	Muay Thai	2,520	
Hanoi Capital Region venues	Vĩnh Phúc	Đầm Vạc Golf Course	Golf		
Hanoi Capital Region venues	Phú Thọ	Việt Trì Stadium	Men's Football	16,000	
Other venues	Hải Phòng	Thủy Nguyên Boat Racing Center	Canoeing, Rowing	N/A	
Other venues	Nam Định	Thiên Trường Stadium	Men's Football	30,000	
Other venues	Ninh Bình	Ninh Bình Province Sports Gymnasium	Karate	3,040	
Other venues	Quảng Ninh	Cẩm Phả Stadium	Women's Football	16,000	
Other venues	Quảng Ninh	Đại Yên Sports Arena	Volleyball	6,105	
Other venues	Quảng Ninh	Quảng Ninh Exhibition Palace of Urban Planning & Expo	Chess		
Other venues	Quảng Ninh	Tuần Châu Beach	Beach volleyball, Beach handball		
Other venues	Quảng Ninh	Tuần Châu	Triathlon, Duathlon		
Other venues	Quảng Ninh	Yên Tử Legacy Resort	Xiangqi		

==== Non-competition venues ====
Province/Municipality	Venue	Events/Designation
Hanoi	Vietnam National Convention Center	International Broadcasting Center (IBC)
Hanoi	Vietnam National Convention Center	Media Press Center (MPC)

=== Volunteers ===
The organizing committee planned to recruit around 3,000 volunteers for the Games with 2,000 of them based in Hanoi. In February 2022, SEAGOC started to work with local Hanoi colleges, mainly Hanoi University and Hanoi Open University to start the process. Applicants were required to be fully vaccinated against COVID-19. Selected volunteers would receive orientation and training between March and April before being assigned to specific venues in April 2022.

=== Torch relay ===
The torch relay was held 31 days prior to the opening ceremony, representing 31 editions of the Southeast Asian Games. The relay began at Hùng Temple in Phú Thọ Province on 11 April 2022, and went through all hosting provinces before arriving at the cauldron at Mỹ Đình National Stadium in Hanoi on 12 May.

=== Ticketing ===
The SEAGOC encouraged each provincial organizing committee to allow spectators to enter competition venues for free. However, the decision to release and/or charge for tickets is ultimately dependent on each province. Hải Phòng and Quảng Ninh expressed interest in free entry for all spectators, with the latter being the largest cluster of venues outside of Hanoi. Meanwhile, Phú Thọ, the host for all of Vietnam's matches in men's football, has planned on selling tickets.

=== Medals ===
The official medals of the 2021 SEA Games were designed by Nguyễn Văn Hùng, an artist from the Vietnam Animation Studio who also worked on the medals for the 2016 Asian Beach Games. One side of the medal features this edition's logo while the other features the mascot Saola in front of Vietnam's tourist sites and patterns.

SEA Games 31 medals are cast in copper-zinc compounds, of which red copper accounts for about 85 percent. Each medal is five millimeters thick. The gold medal is coated with 24-karat gold plating. Silver medals are silver-plated and bronze medals are copper-plated. To increase durability, each medal is coated with three layers of plating inside and covered with an extra layer outside. The ribbon is made of woven fabric.

== Marketing ==
=== Official branding ===
On 30 August 2019, Vietnam Olympic Committee launched a nationwide contest to find the official logo, mascot, slogan, and song for both 31st SEA Games and 2021 ASEAN Para Games. The contest ran until 30 October 2019. The top 3 in each category were intended to be featured on a ballot and Vietnamese nationals could then vote for the winning creation. On 20 October 2019, a mascot named after the canine character Vàng in Nam Cao's famous short story Lão Hạc was awarded People's Choice Award by the organizer. On 26 October 2019, the final top 3 mascots, selected by an internal panel, were announced. These mascots took inspirations from various Vietnamese animals: the endangered species saola, the mythical creature "con nghê", and tigers. The selected designs were met with a negative reception by the Vietnamese public. The organizers later withdrew the announcement, stating that the designs were preliminary and would undergo further adjustments. The reveal was then postponed to November 2019, and later indefinitely postponed.

On 19 November 2020, the winning entries were announced. No theme song was selected from the contest, with the organizing committee commissioning composer Quang Vinh, who previously penned the theme song "For the World of Tomorrow" (Vietnamese: Vì một thế giới ngày mai) for the 22nd SEA Games in 2003, to write a new theme song for this edition.

==== Logo ====
The 31st SEA Games logo was designed by Hoàng Xuân Hiếu. Hiếu's logo is inspired by the combined images of a dove and a human hand to create the "V" shape, representing the words "victory" and "Vietnam". This idea originates from the image of an athlete placing his hand on his left chest, singing the National Anthem before each sacred match. In addition, the bird's wings are a symbol of extraordinary will, desire to conquer and great sportsmanship.

==== Mascot ====
Sao La is the official mascot of the 31st SEA Games 2022

The mascot of the 2021 Southeast Asian Games is Sao La, inspired by the saola – a rare mammal native to central Vietnam. This design by Ngô Xuân Khôi defeated 557 other mascot submissions to emerge as the winner of the 2019 search contest.

==== Slogan ====
"For a Stronger Southeast Asia" (Vietnamese: Vì một Đông Nam Á mạnh mẽ hơn) was chosen as the slogan of this edition. The slogan represents Vietnam's hope as ASEAN Chair 2020, for the region to develop further, and signifies the region's strive to tackle the COVID-19 pandemic.

==== Theme song ====
During the International Press Conference held on 28 February 2022, "Let's Shine" (Vietnamese: Hãy Tỏa Sáng), the official theme song of the 31st SEA Games, was revealed. The song was composed by Huy Tuấn, co-written by Huy Tuấn and Đen Vâu, and performed by Tùng Dương, Hồ Ngọc Hà, Văn Mai Hương, Isaac and Đen Vâu, and features lyrics in English and Vietnamese.

=== Sponsors ===
There were four tiers of sponsorships for the 31st SEA Games. Diamond sponsors contributed more than 10 billion VND (US$438,000) in cash or 13 billion VND (US$569,000) worth of products or services. Platinum sponsors contributed 5-10 billion VND in cash or 8-13 billion VND worth of products or services. Gold sponsors contributed 3-5 billion VND in cash or 6-8 billion VND worth of products or services. Partnering sponsors contributed under 3 billion VND in cash, or under 6 billion VND worth of products or services. Vietcontent was the main sponsorship agency of the Games.

Sponsors of the 2021 Southeast Asian Games
Diamond Sponsor
- Ajinomoto
- Động Lực Sport
- Heineken Asia Pacific (Bia Việt)
- Jogarbola
- Sabeco Brewery (Bia Saigon)
- Stavian Chemical
- Vietnam Posts and Telecommunications Group
Platinum Sponsor
- Digiticket
- Nestlé (Milo)
- Truong Sinh Group
Gold Sponsor
- Medicon (Trueline)
- Suntory PepsiCo Vietnam (Revive)
Partner Sponsor
- Bao Viet Insurance
- Exmicror
- Hahalolo
- Hanaka Group
- Heron Lake Golf Resort
- Heroworld Games & Bowling Center
- Legacy Yen Tu Hotel – MGallery
- MW Jewelry
- PepsiCo (Aquafina)
- TikTok
- Tuan Chau Group
- TVU Networks Corporation
- TY OrgaFood
- Viettel Telecom (TV360)
- Vietravel Airlines

== The Games ==
=== COVID-19 regulations ===
Due to the COVID-19 pandemic, all athletes and officials entering Vietnam were required to have a negative PCR-based COVID-19 test within 72 hours of their departure. Within 24 hours of entry and of their respective event, participants would be tested again using rapid testing.

If an athlete tests positive for COVID-19, they would be quarantined at their designated facility, or transported to a hospital in severe cases. For a positive case tested before their respective event, the NOC could replace the athlete with another one. However, if a positive case turns up while the event is still ongoing, the athlete can no longer participate and their results would be invalidated.

Spectators did not have to show any negative test result to enter. However, the amount of spectators allowed at a venue depended on the local COVID-19 regulations at the time of competition.

=== Opening ceremony ===
The opening ceremony for the Games was held on 12 May 2022 - 20:00 (local time) at the Mỹ Đình National Stadium. Merited artist, Vietnamese choreographer and head of the Vietnamese Department of Performing Arts Trần Ly Ly was the chief director of the ceremony, with record producer Huy Tuấn serving as a music director. Only 31 athletes from each country participated in the parade of nations, as a preventive measure against COVID-19.

3D mapping, virtual reality, augmented reality, extended reality and mixed reality were among the technologies used during the ceremony. More than 1,000 actors were mobilized for the performance, with each smaller performance featured more than 200 actors and actresses. The stage is designed with 44 projectors for demonstrating projection mapping technology and the stadium pitch was turned into a display surface. In addition, the entirety of stand B in the stadium was used as the main stage.

The ceremony, titled "Welcoming Southeast Asia", featured three main performances which included: Friendly Vietnam, Strong Southeast Asia, and Shining Southeast Asia. The stories of bamboo and wet rice culture, which represent the flexibility and resistance of the Vietnamese people and the lotus as the national flower, were among the elements featured in the ceremony.

The first performance, "Friendly Vietnam", shows the message that Vietnam is a country with a culture with its own identity and friendly with people from all countries of the world. The second performance, "Strong Southeast Asia", demonstrates the strength of the ASEAN community. The third performance, "Shining Southeast Asia", shows the strength of solidarity and friendship between Vietnam and ASEAN countries.

==== Welcome, national flag and anthem ====
The ceremony began with the introduction of several dignitaries including Vietnamese President Nguyễn Xuân Phúc, President of the National Assembly Vương Đình Huệ, Deputy Prime Minister Vũ Đức Đam and Speaker of the Parliament of Singapore Tan Chuan Jin to the audiences. Eight People's Army of Vietnam personnel carried the Vietnamese flag to the flagpole while performing the goose step and raised it to the Vietnamese national anthem – "Tiến Quân Ca". At the end of the anthem, a superimposed Vietnamese flag was shown flying across the television screen.

==== Parade of Nations ====
Each delegation was led by a woman wearing a red Áo dài printed with floral pattern carrying an oval-shaped placard that bore the name of the delegation.

Order	Nation	Flag bearer	Sport
1	Brunei Darussalam (BRU)	Anisah Najihah	Pencak silat
2	Cambodia (CAM)	Jessa Khan	Jujitsu
3	Indonesia (INA)	Emilia Nova	Athletics
4	Lao DPR (LAO)	Soulasith Khamvongsa	Pétanque
5	Malaysia (MAS)	Nur Dhabitah Sabri	Diving
6	Myanmar (MYA)	Aung Tun Min	Sepak takraw
7	Philippines (PHI)	Ernest John Obiena	Athletics
8	Singapore (SGP)	Sheik Farhan	Pencak silat
9	Thailand (THA)	Suvijak Khunthong	Jujitsu
10	Timor-Leste (TLS)	Ana da Costa da Silva	Taekwondo
11	Vietnam (VIE)	Nguyễn Huy Hoàng	Swimming

=== Highlights ===
- A total of 1760 medals, comprising 525 gold medals, 522 silver medals and 713 bronze medals were awarded to athletes.
- The host country Vietnam's performance was their best to date and also the best of any country at any games, beating Indonesia's 194-gold finish in 1997. They placed first overall, leading the medal tally for this edition of the games.
  - Vietnam was the best nation in athletics, keeping their streak for three editions.
  - Vietnam won the women's football tournament, keeping their streak for three editions.
- Brunei got their worst medal count in the games since 1985.
- Cambodia finished the games with 9 gold medals their best since 1973 when they competed as the Khmer Republic.
- Laos got their best finish in the games since 2013.
- Prior to 2023, Malaysia got their worst finish in the games since 1983 where they also placed 6th.
- The Philippines got their best finish in the games that they are not hosting since their 57-gold finish in 1993.
- The Philippines lost the gold medal game in basketball, losing their gold streak that was started in 1991.

=== Closing ceremony ===
The closing ceremony for the Games was held on 23 May 2022 at 20:00 (local time) at the Hanoi Indoor Games Gymnasium. The ceremony, bearing the theme "Coming Together to Shine", featured three main performances which included: 'My Hanoi, Your Love', 'Gathering' and 'Shining' to mark the rejuvenation of sports in Southeast Asia after being halted since March 2020 due to the COVID-19 pandemic. Athletes Nguyễn Thị Oanh and Nguyen Huy Hoang (Vietnam), Josh Atkinson (Thailand), and Quah Jing Wen (Singapore) were awarded the "Best Athletes Award" during the ceremony to commend their achievements during the games, breaking Southeast Asian Games records. The flag of the Southeast Asian Games Federation was eventually lowered and handed over to Cambodia, the host country of the 2023 edition.

=== Participating nations ===
All 11 members of Southeast Asian Games Federation took part in the 2021 SEA Games. Below is a list of all the participating NOCs.

While Thailand and Indonesia were initially barred from using their national flags due to sanctions by the World Anti-Doping Agency, the sanction was lifted on 3 February 2022.

- Brunei (24)
- Cambodia (560)
- Indonesia (499)
- Laos (363)
- Malaysia (584)
- Myanmar (352)
- Philippines (656)
- Singapore (476)
- Thailand (888)
- Timor-Leste (69)
- Vietnam (965) (Host)

=== Sports ===
The 31st SEA Games featured 40 sports with 523 events. 16 out of 40 sports are those not included in the Olympic Games at the time the 31st SEA Games were held.

8 out of 40 sports were not included in both the Olympic Games and Asian Games at the time the 31st SEA Games were held: Bodybuilding, Chess, Dancesport, Kickboxing, Muay, Pencak silat, Pétanque and Vovinam. According to the SEAGF Charter and Rules, a host nation must stage a minimum of 22 sports: the two compulsory sports from Category I (athletics and aquatics), in addition to a minimum of 14 sports from Category II (Olympics and Asian Games mandatory sports), and a maximum of 8 sports from Category III.

2021 Southeast Asian Games Sporting Programmes

- Aquatics
  - Diving (8)
  - Swimming (40)
  - Finswimming (13) ^{†}
- Archery (10)
- Athletics (47)
- Badminton (7)
- Basketball
  - 3x3 Basketball (2)
  - 5x5 Basketball (2)
- Billiards and snooker (10) ^{†}
- Bodybuilding (10) ^{†}
- Bowling (6) ^{†}
- Boxing (13)

- Canoeing (11)
- Chess (10) ^{†}
- Cycling
  - Mountain cycling (4)
  - Road cycling (8)
- Dancesport (12) ^{†}
- Esports (10) ^{†}
- Fencing (12)
- Football
  - Football (2)
  - Futsal (2) ^{†}
- Golf (4)

- Gymnastics
  - Aerobic (5)^{†}
  - Artistic (14)
  - Rhythmic (2)
- Handball
  - Beach handball (1)^{†}
  - Indoor handball (2)
- Judo (13)
- Jujitsu (6) ^{†}
- Karate (15) ^{†}
- Kickboxing (12) ^{†}
- Kurash (10) ^{†}
- Muay Thai (11) ^{†}
- Pencak silat (16) ^{†}
- Pétanque (8) ^{†}

- Rowing (16)
- Sepak takraw (8) ^{†}
- Shooting (22)
- Table tennis (7)
- Taekwondo (19)
- Tennis (7)
- Triathlon (4)
- Volleyball
  - Beach volleyball (2)
  - Indoor volleyball (2)
- Vovinam (15) ^{†}
- Weightlifting (14)
- Wrestling (18)
- Wushu (21) ^{†}
- Xiangqi (4) ^{†}

^{†} indicates non-Olympics sports and disciplines

=== Calendar ===
OC	Opening ceremony	●	Event competitions	1	Gold medal events	CC	Closing ceremony

		May																		Events
		6 Fri	7 Sat	8 Sun	9 Mon	10 Tue	11 Wed	12 Thu	13 Fri	14 Sat	15 Sun	16 Mon	17 Tue	18 Wed	19 Thu	20 Fri	21 Sat	22 Sun	23 Mon	Events
Ceremonies								OC											CC	—N/a
Aquatics
Aquatics	Diving			2	2	2	2													61
Aquatics	Finswimming																7	6		61
Aquatics	Swimming									7	7	7	6	7	6					61
Archery											●	●	●	5	5					10
Athletics										11	8	10	7	7	4					47
Badminton												●	●	2	●	●	●	5		7
Basketball	5x5 Basketball											●	●	●	●	●	●	2		4
Basketball	3x3 Basketball								●	2										4
Billiards & snooker										●	●	●	3	1	1	1	2	2		10
Bodybuilding									3	4	3									10
Bowling												2	2	●	2					6
Boxing												●	●	●	●	●	●	11		11
Canoe/Kayak													2	4	4	4	5			19
Chessgames	Chess					●	●		●	●	2	●	2	●	2	2	2			10
Chessgames	Xiangqi									1	1	●	●	●	●	2				4
Cycling	Mountain biking									●	2	2	1							5
Cycling	Road cycling														2	2	1	2		7
Dancesport											6	6								12
Esports									●	●	3	●	1	1	●	1	●	4		10
Fencing									2	2	2	2	2	2						12
Football	Football	●	●	●	●	●	●		●	●	●	●	●	●	●	●	1	1		4
Football	Futsal						●		●	●	●	●	●	●	●	2				4
Golf									●	●	2	●	●	2						4
Gymnastics									2	2	5	5		●	2		2	3		21
Handball	Indoor										●	●	●	●	●	●	2			3
Handball	Beach	●	●	●	●	●	1													3
Judo														2	4	3	3	1		13
Jujitsu										3	3									6
Karate														6	5	3				14
Kickboxing				●	●	●	●		12											12
Kurash						4	3		3											10
Muaythai													1	●	●	●	●	10		11
Pencak silat						●	6		●	●	●	10								16
Pétanque									2	●	2	●	2	●	2					8
Rowing					●	●	4		4	8										16
Sepak takraw									●	●	2	●	2	●	2	●	2			8
Shooting												4	2	2	3	3	4	4		22
Table tennis									●	●	2		●	3	●	2				7
Taekwondo												5	5	5	4					19
Tennis									●	●	2	●	●	●	●	1	2	2		7
Duathlon / Triathlon										2	2									4
Volleyball	Indoor								●	●	●	●	●	●	●	●	●	2		4
Volleyball	Beach										●	●	●	●	●	2				4
Vovinam														3	3	4	3	2		15
Weightlifting															3	4	4	3		14
Wrestling													6	6	6					18
Wushu									4	5	12									21
Daily Gold Medal Events		0	0	2	2	6	16	0	32	47	66	53	44	58	60	36	40	60	0	522
Cumulative total		0	0	2	4	10	26	26	58	105	171	224	268	326	386	422	462	522	522	522
		6 Fri	7 Sat	8 Sun	9 Mon	10 Tue	11 Wed	12 Thu	13 Fri	14 Sat	15 Sun	16 Mon	17 Tue	18 Wed	19 Thu	20 Fri	21 Sat	22 Sun	23 Mon	Total events
		May																		Total events

== Medal table ==
* Host nation (Vietnam)

2021 Southeast Asian Games medal table
Rank	NOC	Gold	Silver	Bronze	Total
1	Vietnam*	205	125	116	446
2	Thailand	92	103	136	331
3	Indonesia	69	91	81	241
4	Philippines	52	70	104	226
5	Singapore	47	46	73	166
6	Malaysia	39	45	90	174
7	Myanmar	9	18	35	62
8	Cambodia	9	13	41	63
9	Laos	2	7	33	42
10	Brunei	1	1	1	3
11	Timor-Leste	0	3	2	5
Totals (11 entries)		525	522	712	1,759

== Broadcasting ==
The Vietnam National Convention Center served as the International Broadcast Center for this edition.

IOC code	Country	Rights holder	Ref.
BRU	Brunei	RTB	
INA	Indonesia	TVRI; MNC Media	
MAS	Malaysia	RTM; Astro	
PHI	Philippines	TV5 Network; Cignal TV; Smart Communications	
SGP	Singapore	Mediacorp	
THA	Thailand	TPT; NBT; GMM 25; PPTV; T Sports	
VIE	Vietnam	VTV	

Preceded by Philippines	Southeast Asian Games; XXXI Southeast Asian Games (2021)	Succeeded by Phnom Penh
