= Muay Thai at the 2021 SEA Games =

- Venue: Vĩnh Phúc Sporting Hall
- Location: Vĩnh Phúc, Vietnam
- Dates: 17–22 May 2022

Muay Thai competitions at the 2021 SEA Games took place at Vĩnh Phúc Sporting Hall in Vĩnh Phúc, Vietnam from 17 to 22 May 2022.

== Medal table ==
* Host nation (Vietnam)

Rank	Nation	Gold	Silver	Bronze	Total
1	Vietnam*	4	6	1	11
2	Thailand	3	4	4	11
3	Philippines	2	0	5	7
4	Malaysia	1	1	0	2
5	Cambodia	1	0	6	7
6	Laos	0	0	4	4
7	Singapore	0	0	1	1
Totals (7 entries)		11	11	21	43

== Medalists ==
=== Waikru events ===
Event	Gold	Silver	Bronze
Women	Philippines; Richein Yosorez; Islay Erika Bomogao Asiong	Vietnam; Phạm Thị Diễm Trang; Phạm Thị Bích Liễu	Thailand; Mawadee Heetnoo; Thanawan Thongduang

=== Men's events ===
Event	Gold	Silver	Bronze
54 kg	Ahmad Nor Iman Aliff Rakib; Malaysia	Huỳnh Hoàng Phi; Vietnam	Ariel Lee Lampacan Biadno; Philippines
54 kg	Ahmad Nor Iman Aliff Rakib; Malaysia	Huỳnh Hoàng Phi; Vietnam	Sakchai Chamchit; Thailand
57 kg	Phillip Delarmino (Note: Nguyễn Doãn Long originally was judged to have won 2–2 over Delarmino in the gold medal match. However, following an appeal the match was reviewed and Delarmino was ruled to have won instead.); Philippines	Nguyễn Doãn Long; Vietnam	Chainarong Yawanophat; Thailand
57 kg	Phillip Delarmino; Philippines	Nguyễn Doãn Long; Vietnam	Kay Netnouvong; Laos
60 kg	Nguyễn Trần Duy Nhất; Vietnam	Chonlawit Preedasak; Thailand	Fritz Aldin Biagtan Carnaje; Philippines
60 kg	Nguyễn Trần Duy Nhất; Vietnam	Chonlawit Preedasak; Thailand	Bora Khun; Cambodia
63.5 kg	Prearith Pao(Yen Dina); Cambodia	Trương Cao Minh Phát; Vietnam	Noy Huksamueang; Laos
63.5 kg	Prearith Pao(Yen Dina); Cambodia	Trương Cao Minh Phát; Vietnam	Norapat Khundam; Thailand
81 kg	Thotsaphon Saophanao; Thailand	Trương Quốc Hùng; Vietnam	Prom Samnang; Cambodia
81 kg	Thotsaphon Saophanao; Thailand	Trương Quốc Hùng; Vietnam	Mauro Francesco Lumba Perez; Philippines

=== Women's events ===
Event	Gold	Silver	Bronze
48 kg	Kullanat Aonok; Thailand	Huỳnh Hà Hữu Hiếu; Vietnam	Wei Ying Cheryl Gwa; Singapore
48 kg	Kullanat Aonok; Thailand	Huỳnh Hà Hữu Hiếu; Vietnam	Rudzma Abubakar Solina; Philippines
51 kg	Wansawang Srila-or; Thailand	Nur Amisha Azrilrizal; Malaysia	Soeng Moeuy; Cambodia
51 kg	Wansawang Srila-or; Thailand	Nur Amisha Azrilrizal; Malaysia	Triệu Thị Phương Thúy; Vietnam
54 kg	Bùi Yến Ly; Vietnam	Ruchira Wongsriwo; Thailand	Lu Soukhaseum; Laos
54 kg	Bùi Yến Ly; Vietnam	Ruchira Wongsriwo; Thailand	Sreychayy Vy; Cambodia
60 kg	Bàng Thị Mai; Vietnam	Sirisopa Sirisak; Thailand	Sreyphin Tuon; Cambodia
60 kg	Bàng Thị Mai; Vietnam	Sirisopa Sirisak; Thailand	April Joy La Madrid Pongchad; Philippines
63.5 kg	Nguyễn Thị Phương Hậu; Vietnam	Kaewrudee Kamtakrapoom; Thailand	Samnang Sam; Cambodia
63.5 kg	Nguyễn Thị Phương Hậu; Vietnam	Kaewrudee Kamtakrapoom; Thailand	Vilatda Bhopphavanh; Laos
