= Nor Sarah Adi =

Malaysian athlete (born 2000)

Personal information
- Full name: Nor Sarah binti Adi
- Nickname: Sarah
- Nationality: Malaysian
- Born: 20 August 2000 (age 25) Maran, Pahang, Malaysia

Sport
- Country: Malaysia
- Sport: Track and field
- Event: Pole vault
Medal record
Women's athletics
Southeast Asian Games
Gold medal – first place	2021 Hanoi	Pole vault
Silver medal – second place	2023 Phnom Penh	Pole vault
Bronze medal – third place	2021 Hanoi	4×100 m relay
Islamic Solidarity Games
Bronze medal – third place	2021 Konya	Pole vault

Nor Sarah binti Adi (born 20 August 2000) is a Malaysian pole vaulter. She won gold medal in pole vault event in 2021 Southeast Asian Games and won bronze medal in 4 × 100 m relay event.
