= Thailand at the 2021 SEA Games =

Thailand at the 2021 Southeast Asian Games
- IOC code: THA
- NOC: National Olympic Committee of Thailand
- Website: www.olympicthai.org (in Thai and English)

in Hanoi, Vietnam
- Competitors: 888 in 40 sports
- Flag bearer: Suwijak Kuntong (jujitsu)
- Medals Ranked 2nd: Gold 92 Silver 103 Bronze 136 Total 331

Southeast Asian Games appearances (overview)
- 1961; 1965; 1967; 1969; 1971; 1973; 1975; 1977; 1979; 1981; 1983; 1985; 1987; 1989; 1991; 1993; 1995; 1997; 1999; 2001; 2003; 2005; 2007; 2009; 2011; 2013; 2015; 2017; 2019; 2021; 2023; 2025; 2027; 2029

Thailand competed at the 31st Southeast Asian Games which was held from 12 to 23 May 2022 in Hanoi, Vietnam.

== Medal summary ==
=== Medal by sport ===
Sport	1st place, gold medalist(s)	2nd place, silver medalist(s)	3rd place, bronze medalist(s)	Total
Athletics	12	11	8	31
Weightlifting	6	5	1	12
Sepak takraw	6	0	0	6
Taekwando	5	4	3	12
Swimming	4	9	9	22
Table tennis	4	3	2	9
Boxing	4	2	3	9
Tennis	4	2	2	8
Badminton	4	2	0	6
Petanque	4	0	2	6
Canoeing	3	6	6	15
Muay thai	3	4	4	11
Bodybuilding	3	3	3	9
Shooting	3	2	10	15
Cycling	3	2	4	9
Gymnastics	3	2	3	8
Dancesport	2	6	4	12
Kickboxing	2	4	6	12
Pencak silat	2	2	4	8
Esports	2	1	3	6
Golf	2	1	1	4
Volleyball	2	1	0	3
Basketball	2	0	1	3
Futsal	2	0	0	2
Judo	1	2	6	9
Archery	1	2	1	4
Kurash	1	1	4	6
Jujitsu	1	1	3	5
Billiards	1	0	8	9
Wrestling	0	6	5	11
Karate	0	4	5	9
Fencing	0	3	7	10
Rowing	0	2	5	7
Finswimming	0	2	5	7
Vovinam	0	2	3	5
Handball	0	2	1	3
Football	0	2	0	2
Wushu	0	1	2	3
Bowling	0	1	0	1
Diving	0	0	1	1
Chess	0	0	1	1
Total	92	103	136	331

=== Medal by date ===
Medals by date
Date	1st place, gold medalist(s)	2nd place, silver medalist(s)	3rd place, bronze medalist(s)	Total
10 May	0	0	7	7
11 May	1	2	7	10
13 May	5	7	3	15
14 May	8	5	14	27
15 May	13	10	13	36
16 May	9	14	12	35
17 May	7	9	10	26
18 May	10	12	17	39
19 May	9	9	19	31
20 May	6	10	11	27
21 May	7	13	16	36
22 May	17	12	7	36
Total	92	103	136	331

== Medalists ==
The following Thailand competitors won medals at the Games.

=== Gold ===
No.	Medal	Name	Sport	Event	Date
1	Gold	Abdulkarim Koolee; Abdulrahim Sidek; Sobri Cheni	Pencak silat	Men's seni regu	May 11
2	Gold	Saowalak Homklin	Kurash	Women's 57kg	May 13
3	Gold	Supun Thongphu	Petanque	Men's shooting	May 13
4	Gold	Chaiwat Sungnoi	Kickboxing	Men's low kick 54kg	May 13
5	Gold	Thongchai Thapphi	Kickboxing	Men's low kick 71kg	May 13
6	Gold	Jiraphan Pongkam	Bodybuilding	Men's flyweight 60kg	May 13
7	Gold	Puripol Boonson	Athletics	Men's 200m	May 14
8	Gold	Suwijak Kuntong	Jujitsu	Men's 62kg	May 14
9	Gold	Aphichai Wandee	Bodybuilding	Men's middleweight 85kg	May 14
10	Gold	Ekkaphon Sukthong	Bodybuilding	Men's lightmiddleweight 80kg	May 14
11	Gold	Parinya Chuaimaroeng	Athletics	Women's Triple jump	May 14
12	Gold	Siripol Phanphae; Suphanit Poonkerd; Joshua Robert Atkinson; Banny Nontanam	Athletics	Mixed 4 × 400 m relay	May 14
13	Gold	Kanokwan Prajuapsook; Rujiwan Bunsinprom; Warunee Kitraksa; Amphawa Thuamon	Basketball	Women's 3x3 tournament	May 14
14	Gold	Chanatip Jakrawan; Frederick Lee Jones Lish; Moses Morgan; Antonio Price Soonthornchote	Basketball	Men's 3x3 tournament	May 14
15	Gold	Natthakritta Vongtaveelap	Golf	Women's individual	May 15
16	Gold	Methasit Boonsane	Cycling	Men's mountain biking	May 15
17	Gold	Masaya Duangsri; Somruedee Pruepruk; Wiphada Chitphuan; Thitima Mahakusol; Athikan Kongkaew; Nisa Thanaattawut; Fueangfa Praphatsarang; Kaewjai Pumsawangkaew; Sirinan Khiaopak	Sepak takraw	Women's team	May 15
18	Gold	Anueat Chaichana; Jirasak Pakbuangoen; Phutawan Sopa; Pattarapong Yupadee; Yodsawat Uthaijaronsri; Wichan Temkort; Siriwat Sakha; Sittipong Khamchan; Kritsanapong Nontakote; Pornchai Kaokaew; Pornthep Thinbangbon; Rachan Wiphan	Sepak takraw	Men's team	May 15
19	Gold	Patcharin Cheapchandaj; Luksika Kumkhum; Pimrada Jattavapornvanit; Anchisa Chanta	Tennis	Women's team	May 15
20	Gold	Kasidit Samrej; Thantab Suksumran; Pruchya Isaro; Yuttana Charoenphon	Tennis	Men's team	May 15
21	Gold	Suthasini Sawettabut; Orawan Paranang; Jinnipa Sawettabut; Wirakan Tayapitak; Wanwisa Earwiriyayothin	Table tennis	Women's team	May 15
22	Gold	Padasak Tanviriyavechakul; Phakpoom Sanguansin; Pattaratorn Passara; Sarayut Tancharoen	Table tennis	Men's team	May 15
23	Gold	Joshua Robert Atkinson	Athletics	Men's 400m	May 15
24	Gold	Suttisak Singkhon	Athletics	Men's Decathlon/heptathlon	May 15
25	Gold	Ratchata Khamdee; Aekkarin Kaewla	Petanque	Men's doubles	May 15
26	Gold	Phiangkhwan Pawapotako	Swimming	Women's 200m breaststroke	May 15
27	Gold	Phatanasak Varanan; Teedech Songsaisakul; Sorawit Rotjanasinlapin	Esports	FIFA online	May 15
28	Gold	Adilan Chemaeng	Pencak silat	Men's 60-65kg	May 16
29	Gold	Jayden Jitraweemohprasit; Thanyalak Chotphibunsin; Chanittha Sastwej	Shooting	Women's 10m Air team	May 16
30	Gold	Subenrat Insaeng	Athletics	Women's Discus throw	May 16
31	Gold	Joshua Robert Atkinson	Athletics	Men's 800m	May 16
32	Gold	Chayut Khongprasit; Soraoat Dapbang; Siripol Phanphae; Puripol Boonson	Athletics	Men's 4 × 100 m Relay	May 16
33	Gold	Supawan Thipat; Supanich Poolkerd; On-uma Chattha; Athicha Phetkun	Athletics	Women's 4 × 100 m Relay	May 16
34	Gold	Sasiwimon Mueangphuan	Gymnastics	Women's Artistic floor exercise	May 16
35	Gold	Issarapong Duangkaew; Thanawan Yananun	Dancesport	Standard Waltz	May 16
36	Gold	Issarapong Duangkaew; Thanawan Yananun	Dancesport	Standard Quickstep	May 16
37	Gold	Suthasinee Autnum; Panwad Thongnim; Pornnapphan Phuangmaiming; Kantida Nurun	Canoeing	Women's kayak four 1000m	May 17
38	Gold	Sudarat Tasorn; Nattaya Yoothong; Anupong Khamfu	Petanque	Triples 2women 1man	May 17
39	Gold	Phutawan Sopa; Pattarapong Yupadee; Siriwat Sakha; Sittipong Khamchan; Pornchai Kaokaew	Sepak takraw	Men's regu	May 17
40	Gold	Masaya Duangsri; Athikan Kongkaew; Fueangfa Praphatsarang	Sepak takraw	Women's regu	May 17
41	Gold	Chaichon Cho	Taekwondo	Men's 68kg	May 17
42	Gold	Thanakrit Yodrak	Taekwondo	Men's 58kg	May 17
43	Gold	Jenjira Srisa-ard	Swimming	Women's 50m butterfly	May 17
44	Gold	Natthakritta Vongtaveelap; Eila Galitsky	Golf	Women's team	May 18
45	Gold	Suthasini Sawettabut; Orawan Paranang	Table tennis	Women's doubles	May 18
46	Gold	Pornpawee Chochuwong; Jongkolphan Kititharakul; Rawinda Prajongjai; Benyapa Aimsaard; Nuntakarn Aimsaard; Pitchamon Opatniputh; Supanida Katethong	Badminton	Women's team	May 18
47	Gold	Phannapa Harnsujin	Taekwondo	Women's 57kg	May 18
48	Gold	Apisit Chamsri; Siripol Phanphae; Ruamchok Semathong; Joshua Robert Atkinson	Athletics	Men's 4 × 400 m relay	May 18
49	Gold	Puripol Boonson	Athletics	Men's 100m	May 18
50	Gold	Kobsit Sittichai	Athletics	Men's High jump	May 18
51	Gold	Kamolchanok Kwanmuang	Swimming	Women's 400m Medley individual	May 18
52	Gold	Jenjira Srisa-ard	Swimming	Women's 50m freestyle	May 18
53	Gold	Kunlavut Vitidsarn; Pakkapon Teeraratsakul; Peeratchai Sukphun; Chaloempon Charoenkitamorn; Nanthakarn Yodphaisong; Panitchaphon Teeraratsakul; Khosit Phetpradab	Badminton	Men's team	May 18
54	Gold	Jutatip Maneephan	Cycling	Women's Road cycling	May 19
55	Gold	Pornnaphan Phuangmaiming; Kantida Nurun	Canoeing	Women's kayak 1000m double	May 19
56	Gold	Kodchaporn Pratumsuwan; Kanoknapus Kaewchomphu; Kanyavee Maneesombutkul	Archery	Women's compound team	May 19
57	Gold	Thanyathon Sukcharoen	Weightlifting	Women's 45kg	May 19
58	Gold	Surodchana Khambao	Weightlifting	Women's 49kg	May 19
59	Gold	Anuphon Phathan; Thanakorn Sangkaew; Thawonsith Ratchakot	Petanque	Men's triples	May 19
60	Gold	Sasiprapa Suksen; Pannipa Kamolrat; Daraka Peanpailun; Mutita Senkram; Jenjira Bubpha; Pacharaporn Srimuang; Sangrawee Meekham; Pattita Moolpho; Jiraprapa Nimrattanasing; Nattamon Artkla; Hataichanok Tappakun; Jiraprapa Tubsuri; Sasicha Phothiwong; Paerploy Huajaipetch	Futsal	Women's team	May 19
61	Gold	Athi Sararat	Tekwondo	Men's 87kg	May 19
62	Gold	Panipak Wongpattanakit	Tekwondo	Women's 49kg	May 19
63	Gold	Aphinya Sroichit; Orasa Thiangkathok	Canoeing	Women's 500m double	May 20
64	Gold	Witsanu Chantri	Weightlifting	Men's 67kg	May 20
65	Gold	Peerapol Chawchiangkwang	Cycling	Men's Road individual	May 20
66	Gold	Orawan Paranang	Table tennis	Women's single	May 20
67	Gold	Chaowala Sriarwut; Kritsada Wongkaeo; Krit Aransanyalak; Apiwat Chaemcharoen; Supakorn Bovonratcadakul; Panut Kittipanuwong; Tanapol Maneepetch; Peerapat Kaewwilai; Atsadawut Jangkot; Sarawut Plalaphruek; Muhammad Osamanmusa; Katawut Hankampa; Panurat Olan; Ronnachai Jungwongsak	Futsal	Men's team	May 20
68	Gold	Varapatsorn Radarong; Tanarattha Udomchavee	Volleyball	Women's Beach volleyball team	May 20
69	Gold	Chanokpon Jiumsukjai	Gymnastics	Men's Aerobic individual	May 21
70	Gold	Natphanlert Auapinyakul; Chidchanok Hirunphoem	Shooting	Mixed air pistol team	May 21
71	Gold	Thongphaphum Vongsukdee	Shooting	Men's 50m Rifle 3 position	May 21
72	Gold	Nutthawut Suepsuan	Weightlifting	Men's 81kg	May 21
73	Gold	Masaya Duangsri; Somruedee Pruepruk; Wiphada Chitphuan; Sasiwimol Janthasit	Sepak takraw	Women's Quard	May 21
74	Gold	Phutawan Sopa; Rachan Viphan; Kritsanapong Nontakote; Pornthep Tinbuaban	Sepak takraw	Men's Quard	May 21
75	Gold	Luksika Kumkhum	Tennis	Women's single	May 21
76	Gold	Chawisa Intakul	Gymnastics	Women's Aerobic individual	May 22
77	Gold	Duangaksorn Chaidee	Weightlifting	Women's 71kg	May 22
78	Gold	Rungsuriya Panya	Weightlifting	Men's +89kg	May 22
79	Gold	Wattana Pu-ob-orm	Billiard	Men's Snooker single	May 22
80	Gold	Anchisa Chanta; Patcharin Cheapchandej	Tennis	Women's single	May 22
81	Gold	Chuthamat Raksat	Boxing	Women's 45-48kg	May 22
82	Gold	Jakkapong Yomkhot	Boxing	Men's 81-89kg	May 22
83	Gold	Banjong Sinsiri	Boxing	Men's 63-69 kg	May 22
84	Gold	Somchay Wongsuwan	Boxing	Men's 57-63kg	May 22
85	Gold	Prasit Poolklang; Wei Puyang; Masayuki Terada; Orapin Senatham; Surattana Thongsri; Ikumi Oeda	Judo	Mixed	May 22
86	Gold	Pornpawee Chochuwong	Badminton	Women's single	May 22
87	Gold	Kunlavut Vitidsarn	Badminton	Men's single	May 22
88	Gold	Thana Somboonprom; Peerawat Piachart; Pakkapon Saethong; Pasu Yensabai; Eikapong Korhonen; Sanpett Marat; Sorawichaya Mahavanakul	Esports	Arena of valor	May 22
89	Gold	Wipawee Srithong; Piyanut Pannoy; Pornpun Guedpard; Thatdao Nuekjang; Kannika Thipachot; Jarasporn Bundasak; Hattaya Bamrungsuk; Sutadta Chuewulim; Pimpichaya Kokram; Ajcharaporn Kongyot; Chatchu-on Moksri; Supattra Pairoj; Sirima Manakij; Tichakorn Boonlert	Volleyball	Women's team	May 22
90	Gold	Wansawang Srila-or	Muaythai	Women's 51kg	May 22
91	Gold	Kullanat Aonok	Muaythai	Women's 48kg	May 22
92	Gold	Thotsaphon Saophanao	Muaythai	Men's 81kg	May 22

=== Silver ===
No.	Medal	Name	Sport	Event	Date
1	Silver	Ilyas Sadara	Pencak silat	Men's seni tunggal	May 11
2	Silver	Chanin Penthongdee; Prem Nampratueng	Rowing	Men's double sculls	May 11
3	Silver	Voragun Srinualnad	Fencing	Men's sabre individual	May 13
4	Silver	Pongsiri Prommachan	Bodybuilding	Men's 65kg	May 13
5	Silver	Arunno Sivapan	Kickboxing	Men's full contact 57kg	May 13
6	Silver	Waraporn Jaiteang	Kickboxing	Women's low kick 60kg	May 13
7	Silver	Chalermlap Santidongssakun	Kickboxing	Men's low kick 63.5kg	May 13
8	Silver	Apicha Boonrangsee	Kurash	Men's 73kg	May 13
9	Silver	Kampanart Valsiripattanachai	Kickboxing	Men's 60kg	May 13
10	Silver	Mingkamon Koomphon	Athletics	Women's hammer throw	May 14
11	Silver	Kittipong Boonmawan	Athletics	Men's hammer throw	May 14
12	Silver	Matinee Reruen; Parisa Chaempudsa	Rowing	Women's double sculls	May 14
13	Silver	Orapa Senatham	Jujitsu	Women's 62kg	May 14
14	Silver	Jenjira Srisa-ard	Swimming	Women's 100m freestyle	May 14
15	Silver	Vipavee Deekaballes	Cycling	Women's mountain biking	May 15
16	Silver	Benny Nontanam	Athletics	Men's Shot put	May 15
17	Silver	Jakkapat Noisri	Athletics	Women's 400m	May 15
18	Silver	Chariwat Khunphet	Wushu	Men's 65kg	May 15
19	Silver	Kamonluck Tungnapakorn; Manita Sathianchokwisan; Natthanan Junkrajang; Jenjira Srisa-ard	Swimming	Women's 4 × 100 m freestyle relay	May 15
20	Silver	Siriporn Sornchuay; Wanchai Kanjanapimine	Bodybuilding	Mixed pairs	May 15
21	Silver	Jiratha Chuthanichakan	Bodybuilding	Wemen's open	May 15
22	Silver	Preeyanoot Patoomsriwiroje; Shinawat Lerson	Dancesport	Latin-paso double	May 15
23	Silver	Apichaya Kuptawanith; Jettapon Inthakun	Dancesport	Latin-Rumba	May 15
24	Silver	Prasitthichai Jiadchat; Jirapat Kaomee; Soragit Buranathanasin	Esports	Wild Rife	May 15
25	Silver	Yanaphon Larp-apharat	Bowling	Men's single	May 16
26	Silver	Pacharaporn Vasanasomsithi; Korawan Thanee; Kanyapat Meechai	Fencing	Women's Épée team	May 16
27	Silver	Voragun Srinualnad; Panachai Wiriyatangsakul; Ruangrit Haekerd	Fencing	Men's Sabre team	May 16
28	Silver	Ornawee Srisahakit; Pichamon Limpaiboon; Phekanya Phaisankiattikun	Taekwondo	Women's Recognized Poomsae	May 16
29	Silver	Issarapong Duangkaew; Thanawan Yananun	Dancesport	Standard Tango	May 16
30	Silver	Pasraporn Phaudech; Anucha Wijitkoon	Dancesport	Standard Foxtrot	May 16
31	Silver	Pasraporn Phaudech; Anucha Wijitkoon	Dancesport	Standard All five	May 16
32	Silver	Pasraporn Phaudech; Anucha Wijitkoon	Dancesport	Standard Viennese waltz	May 16
33	Silver	Jirayu Pleenaram	Athletics	Men's 800m	May 16
34	Silver	Chonthicha Khabut	Athletics	Women's Pole vault	May 16
35	Silver	Tikumporn Surintornta	Gymnastics	Men's vault table	May 16
36	Silver	Saranon Glompan	Pencak silat	Men's 90-95kg	May 16
37	Silver	Jenjira Srisa-ard	Swimming	Women's 50m breaststroke	May 16
38	Silver	Kamonchanok Kwanmuang	Swimming	Women's 200m freestyle	May 16
39	Silver	Areerat Intadis	Athletics	Women's Shot put	May 17
40	Silver	Kiadpradid Srisai	Athletics	Men's Discus throw	May 17
41	Silver	Chutikan Jongkolrattanawattana	Taekwondo	Women's 46kg	May 17
42	Silver	Panachai Jaijulla	Taekwondo	Men's 54kg	May 17
43	Silver	Kamonchanok Kwanmuang	Swimming	Women's 400m freestyle	May 17
44	Silver	Kritsada Kongsrichai	Wrestling	Men's 60kg	May 17
45	Silver	Nanthawat Panphuek	Wrestling	Men's 130kg	May 17
46	Silver	Anucha Yospanya	Wrestling	Men's 97kg	May 17
47	Silver	Wisit Thameirat	Wrestling	Men's 77kg	May 17
48	Silver	Kawalin Takhianram; Aphinya Sroichit	Canoeing	Women's doubles 1000m	May 18
49	Silver	Pongsapak Laopakdee; Weerawish Narkprachar; Ratchanon Chantananuwat	Golf	Men's 77kg	May 18
50	Silver	Nattakarn Kaewkhunanchum	Wrestling	Women's 53kg	May 18
51	Silver	Salinee Srisombut	Wrestling	Women's 68kg	May 18
52	Silver	Chanyanut Chippensuk	Karate	Women's 53kg	May 18
53	Silver	Monsicha Sakulrattanatara	Karate	Women's Kata individual	May 18
54	Silver	Narisara Khunhiranchaiyo	Archery	Women's recurve individual	May 18
55	Silver	Jariya Wichaidit	Athletics	Women's Javelin throw	May 18
56	Silver		Athletics	Women's 4 × 400 m relay	May 18
57	Silver	Soraoat Dapbang	Athletics	Women's 100m	May 18
58	Silver	Jinjutha Pholjamjumrus	Swimming	Women's 400m Medley individual	May 18
59	Silver	Dulyawat Kaewsriyong	Swimming	Men's 200m Medley individual	May 18
60	Silver	Thada Somboon-aum	Weightlifting	Men's 55kg	May 19
61	Silver	Piyawat Chaithong; Pitpaiboon Mahawattanangkul	Canoeing	Men's 1000m double	May 19
62	Silver	Sarawut Sirironnachai	Cycling	Men's Road cycling	May 19
63	Silver	Siripop Chainak	Archery	Men's compound individual	May 19
64	Silver	Pepisut Nawkhao	Karate	Women's 55kg	May 19
'65	Silver	Sasikarn Tongchan	Tekwondo	Women's 62kg	May 19
66	Silver	Chonthichakon Changomon; Supidchaya Pinfun; Thanyaphat Thanawatathaya; Pornnutcha Jedthumrong; Puntita Thongsong	Gymnastics	Rhythmic all around individual	May 19
67	Silver	Kornkarnjana Sapianchai; Natthanan Junkrajang; Kamonchanok Kwanmuang; Jinjutha Pholjamjumras	Swimming	Women's 4 × 200 m freestyle relay	May 19
68	Silver	Navaphat Wongcharoen	Swimming	Men's 200m butterfly	May 19
69	Silver	Thanyaporn Prucksakorn	Shooting	Women's 10m Air pistol	May 20
70	Silver	Thanyaporn Prucksakorn	Shooting	Women's 50m Rifle 3 positions	May 20
71	Silver	Sanikun Tanasan	Weightlifting	Women's 55kg	May 20
72	Silver	Pimsiri Sirikaew	Weightlifting	Women's 59kg	May 20
73	Silver	Piyawat Chaithong; Pitpaiboon Mahawattanangkul; Wittaya Hongkaeo; Mongkhonchai Sisong	Canoeing	Men's four 500m	May 20
74	Silver	Nathawut Kanabkaew; Phanudet Khananpao; Pikanet Sukyik	Karate	Men's Kata team	May 20
75	Silver	Suthasini Sawettabut	Table tennis	Women's single	May 20
76	Silver	Phakpoom Sanguansin	Table tennis	Men's single	May 20
77	Silver	Patcharin Cheapchandej; Pruchya Isaro	Table tennis	Mixed doubles	May 20
78	Silver	Surin Jongklang; Banlue Nakprakhong	Volleyball	Men's Beach team	May 20
79	Silver	Anucha Duangsri	Weightlifting	Men's 73kg	May 21
80	Silver	Aphisit Thamom; Methasit Sitthipharat; Praison Buasamrong; Aditep Srichart	Canoeing	Men's kayak four 500m	May 21
81	Silver	Orasa Thiangkathok	Canoeing	Women's 200m single	May 21
82	Silver	Wichian Sripaengpong	Vovinam	Men's 55kg	May 21
83	Silver	Siriyakorn Khaipandung	Weightlifting	Women's 71kg	May 21
84	Silver	Pimngam Ngamluan	Judo	Women's 45kg	May 21
85	Silver	Eanwisa Muengit	Judo	Women's 48kg	May 21
86	Silver	Anchisa Chanta	Tennis	Women's single	May 21
87	Silver	Paweena Kamchon; Suthimon Chueathamdee; Aphinya Sroichit; Orasa Thiangkathok	Canoeing	Women's four 200m	May 21
88	Silver		Handball	Women's indoor	May 21
89	Silver		Handball	Men's indoor	May 21
90	Silver	Paphonpach Wongaew	Finswimming	Men's 1500m surface	May 21
91	Silver		Football	Women's team	May 21
92	Silver	Chonlawit Preedasak	Muaythai	Men's 60kg	May 22
93	Silver	Ruchira Wongsriwo	Muaythai	Women's 54kg	May 22
94	Silver	Kesinee Tabrai	Vovinam	Women's 60kg	May 22
95	Silver	Sirisopa Sirisak	Muaythai	Women's 60kg	May 22
96	Silver	Kaewrudee Kamtakrapoom	Muaythai	Women's 54kg	May 22
97	Silver	Pimrada Jattavapornvanit; Canlana Tararudee	Tennis	Women's doubles	May 22
98	Silver	Nilawan Techasuep	Boxing	Women's 54-57kg	May 22
99	Silver	Anavat Thongkrathok	Boxing	Men's 75-81kg	May 22
100	Silver	Phittayaporn Chaiwan	Badminton	Women's single	May 22
101	Silver	Benyapa Aimsaard; Nuntakarn Aimsaard	Badminton	Women's doubles	May 22
102	Silver		Finswimming	Men's 4 × 100 m surface relay	May 22
103	Silver		Football	Men's team	May 22

=== Bronze ===
No.	Medal	Name	Sport	Event	Date
1	Bronze	Noppasit Lertsirisombut	Kurash	Men's 81kg	May 10
2	Bronze	Abdulkarim Yusoh; Khairulmahdi Yusoh	Pencak silat	Men's seni article double	May 10
3	Bronze	Duangdara Kumlert	Kurash	Women's 48kg	May 10
4	Bronze	Noelle Roseline Grandjean	Kurash	Men's 52kg	May 10
5	Bronze	Kamwara Boonpeng	Kickboxing	Women's full contact 48kg	May 10
6	Bronze	Ophat Rodnok	Kickboxing	Men's full contact 67kg	May 10
7	Bronze	Piamsuk Permkhunthod	Kickboxing	Women's full contact 52kg	May 10
8	Bronze	Matinee Reruen; Parisa Chaempudsa; Jirakit Phuetthonglang; Nuntida Krajangjam	Rowing	Women's coxless four	May 11
9	Bronze	Chawanwat Juntaphadawan	Diving	Men's individual 3m springboard	May 11
10	Bronze	Nattchanon Saengkaew	Kurash	Men's 66kg	May 11
11	Bronze	Open Kannarong; Nutdanai Ruksawong; Kittipong Raksawong; Chokchai Saitaphap; Chaiwat Sinsuwan; Puwanart Sirichai; Passakorn Srinamkham; Chainarong Srisong; Surasak Waenwiset; Saharis Buakham	Handball	Men's beach handball	May 11
12	Bronze	Surachada Namrak	Kickboxing	Women's full contact 56kg	May 11
13	Bronze	Seksit Thimadee	Kickboxing	Men's full contact 51kg	May 11
14	Bronze	Jasita Yotawan	Kickboxing	Women's full contact 65kg	May 11
15	Bronze	Korawan Thanee	Fencing	Women's épée individual	May 13
16	Bronze	Ruangrit Haekerd	Fencing	Men's sabre individual	May 13
17	Bronze	Kasem Rattanaporn	Bodybuilding	Men's 60kg	May 13
18	Bronze	Paneat Gimsrang	Athletics	Women's hammer throw	May 14
19	Bronze	Chanin Penthongdee; Adisorn Phuphuak; Prem Nampratueng	Rowing	Men's quadruple sculls	May 14
20	Bronze	Nuntida Krajangjam	Rowing	Women's single sculls	May 14
21	Bronze	Nuttapong Sangpromcharee; Dechkajon Yaphonha; Prem Nampratueng	Rowing	Men's pair	May 14
22	Bronze	Rawiwan Sukkaew; Jirakit Phuetthonglang	Rowing	Double sculls	May 14
23	Bronze	Chayut Khongprasit	Athletics	Men's 200m	May 14
24	Bronze	Kanjutha Phattaraboonsorn	Jujitsu	Women's 48kg	May 14
25	Bronze	Wichai Singthong	Bodybuilding	Men's welterweight 75kg	May 14
26	Bronze	Tonnam Kanteemool	Swimming	Men's 1500m freestyle	May 14
27	Bronze	Kamonchanok Kuanmuang	Swimming	Women's 200m butterfly	May 14
28	Bronze	Jinjutha Pholjamjumrus	Swimming	Women's 200m individual medley	May 14
29	Bronze	Sabidee Salaeh	Pencak silat	Men's tanding 50-59kg individual	May 14
30	Bronze	Chayanutphat Shinnakerdchoke	Fencing	Women's foil individual	May 14
31	Bronze	Tarit Thongchumsin; Supha Sangaworawong; Dulyawat Kaewsriyong; Tonnam Kanteemool	Swimming	Men's 4x100 freestyle relay	May 14
32	Bronze	Weerawish Narkprachar	Golf	Men's individual	May 15
33	Bronze	Thongchai Huanak	Wushu	Men's 56kg	May 15
34	Bronze	Jantakan Manoban	Wushu	Women's 48kg	May 15
35	Bronze	Komkrit Keadnin	Jujitsu	Men's 56kg	May 15
36	Bronze	Tadaporn Sakaew	Jujitsu	Women's 45kg	May 15
37	Bronze	Pong Pala	Bodybuilding	Men's Athletic physique	May 15
38	Bronze	Apichaya Kuptawanith; Jettapon Inthakun	Dancesport	All five Latin	May 15
39	Bronze	Shinawat Lerson; Preeyanoot Patoomsriwiroje	Dancesport	Latin Samba	May 15
40	Bronze	Apichaya Kuptawanith; Jettapon Inthakun	Dancesport	Latin Jive	May 15
41	Bronze	Shinawat Lerson; Preeyanoot Patoomsriwiroje	Dancesport	Latin cha cha	May 15
42	Bronze	Warawut Penpaitun; Sittisak Hongkampew; Anucha Lampao	Esports	Free fire	May 15
43	Bronze	Jenjira Wankrue	Pencak silat	Women's 65-70kg	May 15
44	Bronze	Suthat Bunchit	Pencak silat	Men's 70-80kg	May 15
45	Bronze	Schwakon Triniphakorn; Pornchai Suhkonpanich; Chanittha Sastwej	Shooting	Men's Rapid fire pistol team	May 16
46	Bronze	Chanittha Sastwej	Shooting	Women's 10m Air fire	May 16
47	Bronze	Ram Khamhaeng	Shooting	Men's 25m Rapid fire pistol	May 16
48	Bronze	Natthapon Dansungnoen	Athletics	Men's 100m hurdles	May 16
49	Bronze	Sippakorn Wetchakornpatiwong	Taekwondo	Men's Recognized Poomsae individual	May 16
50	Bronze	Ornawee Srisahakit	Taekwondo	Women's's Recognized Poomsae individual	May 16
51	Bronze	Navaphat Wongcharoen	Swimming	Men's 100m butterfly	May 16
52	Bronze	Mia Millar	Swimming	Women's 200m backstroke	May 16
53	Bronze	Prasobchai Kaewrungrueang; Dulyawat Kaewsriyong; Tonnam Kanteemool; Navaphat Wongcharoen	Swimming	Men's 4 × 100 m Medley relay	May 16
54	Bronze	Yuttapop Pakpoj	Billiards	Men's English single	May 16
55	Bronze	Praprut Chaithanasakun	Billiards	Men's English single	May 16
56	Bronze	Suchakree Poomjang	Billiards	Men's Snooker 6 red single	May 16
57	Bronze	Boriphat Jariyatatkone	Shooting	Men's 50m pistol	May 17
58	Bronze	Supuksorn Nuntana; Warinthorn Phetpraphan; Phusiri Sirimongkhon; Keerati Sukprasart	Cycling	Mixed mountain cross country relay	May 17
59	Bronze	Chayanutphat Shinnakerdchoke; Chayada Smithisukul; Sasinpat Doungpattra	Fencing	Women's Foil team	May 17
60	Bronze	Nattiphong Singkham; Chinnaphat Chaloemchanen; Korakote Juengamnuaychai	Fencing	Men's Épée team	May 17
61	Bronze	Mawadee Heetnoo; Thanawan Thongduang	Muaythai	Women's Waikru	May 17
62	Bronze	Sunitra Phuangyoo; Phongsakorn Ainpu	Petanque	Mixed double	May 17
63	Bronze	Athima Saowaphaiboon	Athletics	Women's Shot put	May 17
64	Bronze	Chiranuwat Chamnanjan	Wrestling	Men's 87kg	May 17
65	Silver	Wisit Thamwirat	Wrestling	Men's 77kg	May 17
66	Bronze	Purin Rongkhankaew	Esports	Men's PUBG	May 17
67	Bronze	Tanyaporn Prucksakorn	Shooting	Women's 25m pistol	May 18
68	Bronze	Napis Tortungpanich; Chanittha Saswej	Shooting	Mixed air rifle	May 18
69	Bronze	Phatthanaphong Srisawat; Notethakod Wangpaisit; Sitsadipat Doungpattra	Fencing	Men's Foil team	May 18
70	Bronze	Tonkhaw Phokaew; Bandhita Srinualnad; Onwipha Innurak	Fencing	Women's Foil team	May 18
71	Bronze	Phakpoom Sanguansin; Orawan Paranang	Table tennis	Mixed double	May 18
72	Bronze	Padasak Tanviriyavechakul; Suthasini Sawettabut	Table tennis	Mixed double	May 18
73	Bronze	Methasit Sitthipharat	Canoeing	Men's kayak 1000m single	May 18
74	Bronze	Sriprapa Tho-kaew	Wrestling	Women's 57kg	May 18
75	Bronze	Chalermpon Piwlaaiad	Karate	Men's 67kg	May 18
76	Bronze	Arm Sukkiaw	Karate	Women's 61kg	May 18
77	Bronze	Suphattra Jaikhumkao; Pitima Thaweerattanasinp	Judo	Women's Kata	May 18
78	Bronze	Supanich Poolkerd	Athletics	Women's 100m	May 18
79	Bronze	Tawan Kaeodam	Athletics	Men's High jump	May 18
80	Bronze	Yarinda Sunthornrungsri	Swimming	Women's 1500m freestyle	May 18
81	Bronze	Tawin Hanprab	Taekwondo	Men's 63kg	May 18
82	Bronze	Phiangkwan Pawapotako; Jinjutha Pholjamjumrus; Jenjira Srisa-ard; Mia Millar	Swimming	Women's 4x100 Medley relay	May 18
83	Bronze	Karnsinee Thanartippiyapat; Pemika Rahmanitarani; Preeyawan Phuttachat; Kanokpon Parnpim; Thitima Namsiripongpan	Esports	Women's Wild rift team	May 18
84	Bronze	Suthimon Chueathamdee; Paweena Kamchon; Aphinya Sroichit; Orasa Thiangkrathok	Canoeing	Women's four 1000m	May 19
85	Bronze	Tinnakrit Arunnuntapanich; Thanadon Kulpruethanon	Chess	Men's team	May 19
86	Bronze	Natphanlert Auapinyakul; Peepaphon Chotpaiboonpan; Noppadon Sutiviruch	Shooting	Men's 10m Air pistol team	May 19
87	Bronze	Kotchaphon Tangsrivong	Athletics	Women's Walk 20km	May 19
88	Bronze	Tony Ah-thitpayne	Athletics	Men's Marathon	May 19
89	Bronze	Wei Puyang	Judo	Men's 90kg	May 19
90	Bronze		Vovinam	Men's 60kg	May 19
91	Bronze		Vovinam	Women's pair sword	May 19
92	Bronze	Teerawat Pongsri	Karate	Men's 84kg	May 19
93	Bronze	Kewalin Songklin	Karate	Women's 68kg	May 19
94	Bronze	Parinya Chamnanjan	Wrestling	Men's 74kg	May 19
95	Bronze	Siripong Jumpakarn	Wrestling	Men's 65kg	May 19
96	Bronze	Lalita Chiaochan; Aphinya Nuanwichit; Cheerawan Kanlaya	Petanque	Women's triples	May 19
97	Bronze	Praprut Chaithanasakun; Thawat Sujarithurakarn	Billiards	Men's English double	May 19
98	Bronze	Kasidit Samrej; Luksika Kumkhum	Tennis	Mixed doubles	May 19
99	Bronze	Kanyavee Maneesombatkul; Sirapop Chainak	Archery	Mixed compound team	May 19
100	Bronze	Phetdarin Somrat	Cycling	Women's Road individual	May 20
101	Bronze	Natsara Champalat; Chidchanok Hiranphoem; Thanyaporn Prucksakorn	Shooting	Women's 10m Air pistol team	May 20
102	Bronze	Orasa Thiangkathok	Canoeing	Women's canoe 500m single	May 20
103	Bronze	Panwad Thongnim; Kantida Nurun	Canoeing	Women's kayak 500m double	May 20
104	Bronze	Pennipa Nakjui	Billiards	Women's 10 ball single	May 20
105	Bronze	Surasak Puntanam	Judo	Men's 66kg	May 20
106	Bronze	Kiattisak Jaichuen	Judo	Men's 60kg	May 20
107	Bronze	Akari Warasiha	Judo	Women's 52kg	May 20
108	Bronze	Siwakon Muekthong; Worakan Soda; Teerapat Kanabkaew; Teerawat Pondsri; Puris Saiyasombat; Chaiwat Phiandee; Chalermpon Piwlaaiad	Karate	Men's kumite team	May 20
109	Bronze	Yuwapa Poosanapong; Irada Pantao; Supatsorn Watcharaporn	Gymnastics	Men's Aerobic trio	May 21
110	Bronze	Suthasinee Autnun; Panwad Thongnim; Pornnaphan Phuangmaiming; Kantida Nurun	Canoeing	Women's kayak four 500m	May 21
111	Bronze	Paweena Kamchon; Suthimon Chueathamdee; Kewalin Takhianram; Nootchanat Thoongpong	Canoeing	Women's four 500m	May 21
112	Bronze	Thanyaporn Prucksakorn; Noppadon Sutiviruch	Shooting	Mixed air pistol team	May 21
113	Bronze	Napis Tortungpanich	Shooting	Men's 50m Rifle 3 positions	May 21
114	Bronze	Jetsadakorn Suksai	Judo	Men's 55kg	May 21
115	Bronze	Suriya Suwannasing	Billiards	Men's 3 Cushion carom single	May 21
116	Bronze	Sompol Saetang	Billiards	Men's 3 Cushion carom single	May 21
117	Bronze	Passakorn Suwannawat	Billiards	Men's Snooker single	May 21
118	Bronze	Navuti Liphongyu	Cycling	Men's 3 Cushion carom single	May 21
119	Bronze		Finswimming	Women's 4 × 200 m surface relay	May 21
120	Bronze	Nusanee Chandaeng	Finswimming	Women's 100m Bi fins	May 21
121	Bronze	Khet Chamnanwat	Finswimming	Men's 100m Surface	May 21
122	Bronze	Yuttana Charoenphon	Tennis	Men's single	May 21
123	Bronze	Chainarong Yawanophat	Muaythai	Men's 57kg	May 21
124	Bronze	Norapat Khundam	Muaythai	Men's 63.5kg	May 21
125	Bronze	Nillada Meekoon	Boxing	Women's 48-51kg	May 20
126	Bronze	Thanarat Saengphet	Boxing	Men's 48-52kg	May 19
127	Bronze	Peerapat Yeasungnoen	Boxing	Men's 48-52kg	May 19
128	Bronze	Tayida Kosonkitja	Vovinam	Men's 48-52kg	May 19
129	Bronze		Cycling	Women's Road team	May 22
130	Bronze	Phacharamethi Tharaphan	Weightlifting	Men's 89kg	May 22
131	Bronze		Gymnastics	Mixed pair	May 22
132	Bronze		Gymnastics	Aerobic group	May 22
133	Bronze	Khet Chamnanwat	Finswimming	Men's 500m surface	May 22
134	Bronze		Finswimming	Mixed 4 × 100 m Bi-fin relay	May 22
135	Bronze		Basketball	Men's 5x5 team	May 22
136	Bronze		Muaythai	Women's 54kg	May 20
