= Athletics at the 2021 SEA Games =

Track and field events in Hanoi

- Venue: Mỹ Đình National Stadium (track and field events); Hanoi Circuit (marathon and 20km walk)
- Date: 14–19 May 2022
- Nations: 11

The athletics events at the 2021 SEA Games took place from 14 to 19 May 2022 in Hanoi, Vietnam. The Games featured a total of 47 events.

== Venue ==
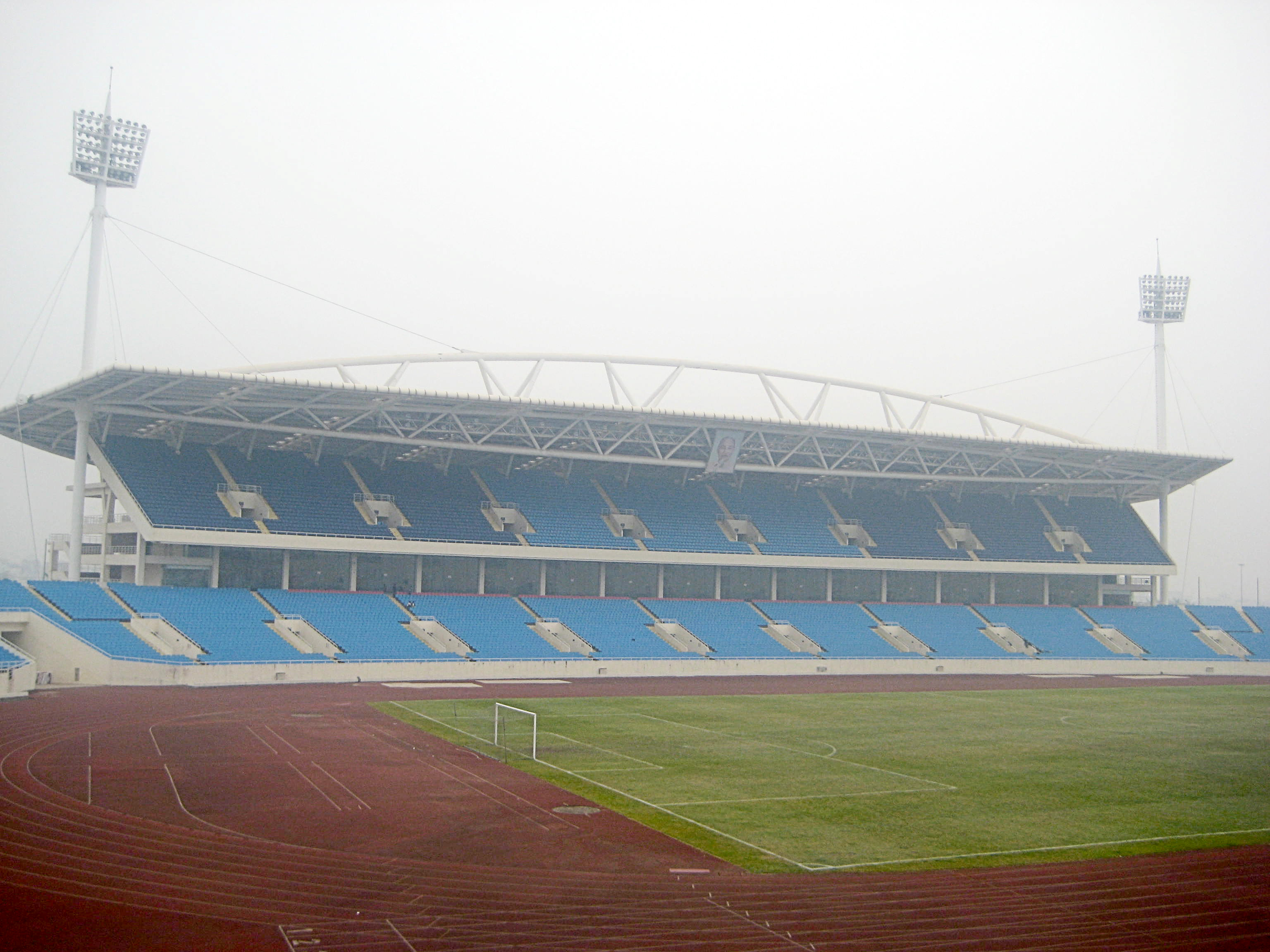
Mỹ Đình National Stadium

Most track and field events were held at Mỹ Đình National Stadium with the exception of hammer throw and discus throw events being held at nearby fields within the National Sports Complex. The marathon and 20km walk events were contested at the nearby Hanoi Street Circuit.

Hanoi Sports Training and Competition Centre served as the practice venue.

== Schedule ==
Legend
P	Preliminary round	Q	Qualification	H	Heats	½	Semi-finals	F	Final

Ref
Men's
Date	May 14		May 15		May 16		May 17		May 18		May 19	
Event	M	E	M	E	M	E	M	E	M	E	M	E
100 m									H	F		
200 m	H	F										
400 m			H	F								
800 m						F						
1500 m		F										
5000 m				F								
10,000 m								F				
110 m hurdles					H	F						
400 m hurdles							H	F				
3000 m steeplechase						F						
4 × 100 m relay						F						
4 × 400 m relay									H	F		
Marathon											F	
20 km walk											F	
Long jump				F								
Triple jump								F				
High jump										F		
Pole vault		F										
Shot put				F								
Discus throw								F				
Javelin throw		F										
Hammer throw	F											
Decathlon	F											
Women's
Date	May 14		May 15		May 16		May 17		May 18		May 19	
Event	M	E	M	E	M	E	M	E	M	E	M	E
100 m									H	F		
200 m	H	F										
400 m			H	F								
800 m						F						
1500 m	F											
5000 m		F										
10,000 m										F		
100 m hurdles					H	F						
400 m hurdles							H	F				
3000 m steeplechase				F								
4 × 100 m relay						F						
4 × 400 m relay									H	F		
Marathon											F	
20 km walk											F	
Long jump						F						
Triple jump		F										
High jump				F								
Pole vault						F						
Shot put								F				
Discus throw						F						
Javelin throw										F		
Hammer throw	F											
Heptathlon					F							
Mixed
Date	May 14											
Event	M	E										
4 × 400 m relay		F										

== Medal table ==
* Host nation (Vietnam)

Rank	Nation	Gold	Silver	Bronze	Total
1	Vietnam*	22	14	8	44
2	Thailand	12	11	8	31
3	Philippines	5	7	14	26
4	Malaysia	5	3	8	16
5	Indonesia	2	5	4	11
6	Singapore	1	3	7	11
7	Myanmar	0	2	0	2
7	Timor-Leste	0	2	0	2
Totals (8 entries)		47	47	49	143

== Medalists ==
=== Men's events ===
Key
GR	Southeast Asian Games record	NR	National record

Event	Gold		Silver		Bronze	
100 m	Puripol Boonson; Thailand	10.44	Soraoat Dabbang; Thailand	10.56	Marc Brian Louis; Singapore	10.56
200 m	Puripol Boonson; Thailand	20.37 GR, NR	Ngần Ngọc Nghĩa; Vietnam	20.74 NR	Chayut Khongprasit; Thailand	20.77
400 m	Joshua Atkinson; Thailand	46.44	Lê Ngọc Phúc; Vietnam	47.27	Tan Zong Yang; Singapore	47.46
800 m	Joshua Atkinson; Thailand	1:55.75	Jirayu Pleenaram; Thailand	1:55.77	Trần Văn Đảng; Vietnam	1:56.50
1500 m	Lương Đức Phước; Vietnam	3:54.37	Trần Văn Đảng; Vietnam	3:55.66	Alfrence Braza; Philippines	3:56.35
5000 m	Nguyễn Văn Lai; Vietnam	16:34.10	Felisberto de Deus; Timor-Leste	16:35.75	Sonny Wagdos; Philippines	16:35.89
10000 m	Nguyễn Văn Lai; Vietnam	32:17.34	Felisberto de Deus; Timor-Leste	32:23.91	Lê Văn Thao; Vietnam	32:37.66
110 m hurdles	Clinton Kingsley Bautista; Philippines	13.78 NR	Ang Chen Xiang; Singapore	13.94 NR	Natthaphon Dansungnoen; Thailand	13.99
400 m hurdles	Eric Cray; Philippines	50.41	Quách Công Lịch; Vietnam	50.82	Calvin Quek; Singapore	51.19 NR
3000 m steeplechase	Lê Tiến Long; Vietnam	9:02.84	Đỗ Quốc Luật; Vietnam	9:06.44	Atjong Tio Purwanto; Indonesia	9:10.99
4 × 100 m relay	Thailand; Chayut Khongprasit; Soraoat Dabbang; Siripol Phanpae; Puripol Boonson	38.58 GR, NR	Malaysia; Muhd Azeem Fahmi; Muhammad Arsyad Saat; Muhammad Haiqal Hanafi; Muhammad Zulfiqar Ismail	39.09 NR	Singapore; Marc Brian Louis; Joshua Hanwei Chua; Mark Lee; Ian Koe	39.44
4 × 400 m relay	Thailand; Aphisit Chumsri; Siripol Phanpae; Ruamchok Semathong; Joshua Atkinson	3:07.58	Vietnam; Lê Ngọc Phúc; Trần Đình Sơn; Trần Nhật Hoàng; Quách Công Lịch	3:08.52	Singapore; Calvin Quek; Thiruben Thana Rajan; Reuben Rainer Lee; Tan Zong Yang	3:11.09
Marathon	Hoàng Nguyên Thanh; Vietnam	2:25:08	Agus Prayogo; Indonesia	2:25:38	Tony Payne; Thailand	2:26:40
20 km walk	Võ Xuân Vĩnh; Vietnam	1:32:32	Hendro Yap; Indonesia	1:35:21	Nguyễn Thành Ngưng; Vietnam	1:37:43
High jump	Sitthichai Kobsit; Thailand	2.21 m PB	Nauraj Singh Randhawa; Malaysia	2.18 m	Mohamad Eizlan Dahalan; Malaysia	2.18 m
High jump	Sitthichai Kobsit; Thailand	2.21 m PB	Nauraj Singh Randhawa; Malaysia	2.18 m	Tawan Kaeodam; Thailand	2.18 m
High jump	Sitthichai Kobsit; Thailand	2.21 m PB	Nauraj Singh Randhawa; Malaysia	2.18 m	Vũ Đức Anh; Vietnam	2.18 m
Pole vault	Ernest John Obiena; Philippines	5.46 m GR	Hocket de los Santos; Philippines	5.00 m	Iskandar Alwi; Malaysia	4.80 m
Long jump	Nguyễn Tiến Trọng; Vietnam	7.80 m	Janry Ubas; Philippines	7.73 m	Sapwaturrahman; Indonesia	7.61 m
Triple jump	Andre Anura Anuar; Malaysia	16.21 m	Mark Harry Diones; Philippines	15.87 m	Trần Văn Điển; Vietnam	15.84 m
Shot put	William Morrison III; Philippines	18.14 m GR	Jakkapat Noisri; Thailand	17.32 m	Muhammad Ziyad Zolkefli; Malaysia	17.20 m
Discus throw	Irfan Shamsuddin; Malaysia	58.26 m	Kiadpradid Srisai; Thailand	51.18 m	William Morrison III; Philippines	50.44 m
Hammer throw	Jackie Wong Siew Cheer; Malaysia	66.49 m	Kittipong Boonmawan; Thailand	64.54 m	Sadat Marzuqi Ajisan; Malaysia	58.86 m
Javelin throw	Nguyễn Hoài Văn; Vietnam	70.87 m	Abdul Hafiz; Indonesia	70.58 m	Melvin Calano; Philippines	66.86 m
Decathlon	Sutthisak Singkhon; Thailand	7603 pts	Aries Toledo; Philippines	7469 pts NR	Janry Ubas; Philippines	6977 pts

=== Women's events ===
Event	Gold		Silver		Bronze	
100 m	Kayla Richardson; Philippines	11.60	Veronica Shanti Pereira; Singapore	11.62	Supanich Poolkerd; Thailand	11.66
200 m	Veronica Shanti Pereira; Singapore	23.52 NR	Kyla Richardson; Philippines	23.56	Kayla Richardson; Philippines	23.87
400 m	Nguyễn Thị Huyền; Vietnam	52.83	Benny Nontanam; Thailand	54.01	Quách Thị Lan; Vietnam	54.40
800 m	Khuất Phương Anh; Vietnam	2:08.74	Agustina Mardika Manik; Indonesia	2:09.99	Savinder Kaur Jogindr Singh; Malaysia	2:10.24
1500 m	Nguyễn Thị Oanh; Vietnam	4:14.98	Khuất Phương Anh; Vietnam	4:26.90	Goh Chui Ling; Singapore	4:33.41
5000 m	Nguyễn Thị Oanh; Vietnam	16:44.06	Phạm Thị Hồng Lệ; Vietnam	16:45.05	Joida Gagnao; Philippines	17:37.74
10000 m	Phạm Thị Hồng Lệ; Vietnam	35:56.38	Khin Mar Se; Myanmar	38:22.01	Goh Chui Ling; Singapore	39:22.26
100 m hurdles	Bùi Thị Nguyên; Vietnam	13.51	Emilia Nova; Indonesia	13.69	Jelly Dianne Paragile; Philippines	13.72
400 m hurdles	Quách Thị Lan; Vietnam	56.33	Nguyễn Thị Huyền; Vietnam	56.41	Robyn Brown; Philippines	56.44 NR
3000 m steeplechase	Nguyễn Thị Oanh; Vietnam	9:52.44 GR	Nguyễn Thị Hương; Vietnam	10:18.60	Joida Gagnao; Philippines	10:41.69
4 × 100 m relay	Thailand; Supawan Thipat; Supanich Poolkerd; Onuma Chattha; Athicha Phetkun	44.39	Vietnam; Lê Thị Mộng Tuyền; Hà Thị Thu; Dương Thị Hoa; Hoàng Dư Ý	45.25	Malaysia; Shelly Komalam; Zaidatul Husniah Zulkifli; Nor Sarah Adi; Azreen Nabila Alias	45.32
4 × 400 m relay	Vietnam; Hoàng Thị Ngọc; Quách Thị Lan; Nguyễn Thị Hằng; Nguyễn Thị Huyền	3:37.99	Thailand; Sukanya Janchaona; Supanich Poolkerd; Patcharaporn Jongkraijak; Benny Nontanam	3:42.90	Philippines; Eloisa Luzon; Bernalyn Bejoy; Maureen Schrijvers; Robyn Brown	3:43.26
Marathon	Odekta Elvina Naibaho; Indonesia	2:55:28	Christine Hallasgo; Philippines	2:56:07	Hoàng Thị Ngọc Hoa; Vietnam	2:57:35
20 km walk	Nguyễn Thị Thanh Phúc; Vietnam	1:48:10	Zin May Htet; Myanmar	1:52:34	Kotchaphon Tangsrivong; Thailand	1:56:07
High jump	Phạm Thị Diễm; Vietnam	1.78 m	Michelle Sng Suat Li; Singapore	1.75 m	Phạm Quỳnh Giang; Vietnam	1.70 m
Pole vault	Nor Sarah Adi; Malaysia	4.00 m	Chonthicha Khabut; Thailand	3.80 m	Alyana Joyce Nicholas; Philippines	3.60 m
Long jump	Vũ Thị Ngọc Hà; Vietnam	6.39 m	Bùi Thị Thu Thảo; Vietnam	6.38 m	Maria Natalia Londa; Indonesia	6.18 m
Triple jump	Parinya Chuaimaroeng; Thailand	13.66 m	Vũ Thị Ngọc Hà; Vietnam	13.52 m	Maria Natalia Londa; Indonesia	13.45 m
Shot put	Eki Febri Ekawati; Indonesia	15.20 m	Areerat Intadis; Thailand	15.04 m	Athima Saowaphaiboon; Thailand	12.51 m
Discus throw	Subenrat Insaeng; Thailand	53.09 m	Queenie Ting; Malaysia	52.36 m NR	Choo Kang Ni; Malaysia	46.57 m
Hammer throw	Grace Wong; Malaysia	57.13 m	Mingkamon Koomphon; Thailand	50.28 m	Panwat Gimsrang; Thailand	49.64 m
Javelin throw	Lò Thị Hoàng; Vietnam	56.37 m GR, NR	Jariya Wichaidit; Thailand	55.65 m	Evalyn Palabrica; Philippines	49.07 m
Heptathlon	Nguyễn Linh Na; Vietnam	5415 pts NR	Sarah Dequinan; Philippines	5381 pts NR	Norliyana Kamaruddin; Malaysia	5262 pts NR

=== Mixed ===
Event	Gold		Silver		Bronze	
4 × 400 m relay	Thailand; Siripol Punpa; Supanich Poolkerd; Joshua Atkinson; Benny Nontanam	3:19.29 GR, NR	Vietnam; Trần Nhật Hoàng; Nguyễn Thị Huyền; Trần Đình Sơn; Quách Thị Lan	3:19.37 NR	Philippines; Edgardo Aljean; Bernalyn Bejoy; Joyme Sequita; Jessel Lumapas	3:31.53
