= Sepak takraw at the 2021 SEA Games =

- Venue: Hoàng Mai District Sporting Hall
- Location: Hanoi, Vietnam
- Dates: 13–21 May 2022

Sepak takraw competitions at the 2021 SEA Games took place at Hoàng Mai District Sporting Hall in Hanoi, Vietnam from 13 to 21 May 2022.

== Participating nations ==
- Cambodia
- Indonesia
- Malaysia
- Myanmar
- Laos
- Philippines
- Thailand
- Vietnam (host)

== Medal table ==
* Host nation (Vietnam)

Rank	Nation	Gold	Silver	Bronze	Total
1	Thailand	6	0	0	6
2	Indonesia	1	1	1	3
3	Myanmar	1	0	3	4
4	Vietnam*	0	3	3	6
5	Malaysia	0	3	2	5
6	Laos	0	1	1	2
7	Philippines	0	0	2	2
Totals (7 entries)		8	8	12	28

== Medalists ==
=== Men ===
Event	Gold	Silver	Bronze
Team Regu	Thailand; Anuwat Chaichana; Jirasak Pakbuangoen; Phutawan Sopa; Yupadee Pattarapong; Yodsawat Uthaijaronsri; Wichan Temkort; Siriwat Sakha; Sittipong Khamchan; Kritsanapong Nontakote; Pornchai Kaokaew; Pornthep Thinbangbon; Rachan Wiphan	Malaysia; Zuhri Zain; Zarif Marican Ibrahim Marican; Aidil Aiman Azwawi; Afifuddin Razali; Faisal Fuad; Norfaizzul Abd Razak; Noraizat Nordin; Haziq Hairul Nizam; Redwan Hakim; Zulhasni Basri; Eqbal Shamsudin; Asyraaf Hadi	Vietnam; Nguyễn Tiến Công; Lê Anh Tuấn; Nguyễn Huy Quyền; Ngô Thành Long; Huỳnh Ngọc Sang; Vương Minh Châu; Đỗ Mạnh Tuấn; Nguyễn Hoàng Lân; Đầu Văn Hoàng
Regu	Thailand; Jirasak Pakbuangoen; Yupadee Pattarapong; Siriwat Sakha; Sittipong Khamchan; Pornchai Kaokaew	Malaysia; Zarif Marican Ibrahim Marican; Faisal Fuad; Afifuddin Razali; Noraizat Nordin; Norfaizzul Abd Razak	Philippines; Mark Joseph Gonzales; Rheyjey Ortouste; Ronsted Gabayeron; John Bobier; Jason Huerte
Regu	Thailand; Jirasak Pakbuangoen; Yupadee Pattarapong; Siriwat Sakha; Sittipong Khamchan; Pornchai Kaokaew	Malaysia; Zarif Marican Ibrahim Marican; Faisal Fuad; Afifuddin Razali; Noraizat Nordin; Norfaizzul Abd Razak	Indonesia; Muhammad Hardiansyah Muliang; Saiful Rijal; Abdul Halim Radjiu
Double	Indonesia; Muhammad Hardiansyah Muliang; Saiful Rijal; Jelki Ladada	Malaysia; Afifuddin Razali; Noraizat Nordin; Aidil Aiman Azwawi	Philippines; Jason Huerte; Rheyjey Ortouste; Mark Joseph Gonzales
Double	Indonesia; Muhammad Hardiansyah Muliang; Saiful Rijal; Jelki Ladada	Malaysia; Afifuddin Razali; Noraizat Nordin; Aidil Aiman Azwawi	Myanmar; Wai Lin Aung; Kyaw Zin Latt
Quard	Thailand; Jirasak Pakbuangoen; Phutawan Sopa; Rachan Viphan; Yodsawat Uthaijaronsri; Kritsanapong Nontakote; Pornthep Tinbuaban	Indonesia; Muhammad Hardiansyah Muliang; Saiful Rijal; Andi Try Sandi Saputra; Abdul Halim Radjiu	Vietnam; Nguyễn Văn Lý; Đỗ Mạnh Tuấn; Nguyễn Hoàng Lân; Đầu Văn Hoàng
Quard	Thailand; Jirasak Pakbuangoen; Phutawan Sopa; Rachan Viphan; Yodsawat Uthaijaronsri; Kritsanapong Nontakote; Pornthep Tinbuaban	Indonesia; Muhammad Hardiansyah Muliang; Saiful Rijal; Andi Try Sandi Saputra; Abdul Halim Radjiu	Myanmar; Wai Lin Aung; Thant Zin Oo; Aung Thu Min; Kyaw Zin Latt

=== Women ===
Event	Gold	Silver	Bronze
Team Regu	Thailand; Masaya Duangsri; Somruedee Pruepruk; Wiphada Chitphuan; Thitima Mahakusol; Athikan Kongkaew; Nisa Thanaattawut; Fueangfa Praphatsarang; Kaewjai Pumsawangkaew; Sirinan Khiaopak	Vietnam; Dương Thị Xuyến; Trần Thị Hồng Nhung; Nguyễn Thị Mỹ; Giáp Thị Hiền; Nguyễn Thị Phương Trinh; Nguyễn Thị Yên; Nguyễn Thị Thu Trang; Vũ Thị Vân Anh; Lê Thị Tú Trinh	Malaysia; Siti Nor Zubaidah Che Abd Wahab; Siti Nor Suhaida Jafri; Nur Fatihah Azizul; Nur Natasha Amira Fazil; Nor Azira Suhaimi; Razman Anam; Nadillatul Rosmahani Saidin; Nurul Izzatul Hikmah Md Zulkifli; Kamisah Khamis; Nur Fateha Rossli; Nur Asmida Rambli; Siti Farisha Ismi Hissan
Regu	Thailand; Masaya Duangsri; Athikan Kongkaew; Fueangfa Praphatsarang	Vietnam; Trần Thị Thu Hoài; Trần Thị Hồng Nhung; Nguyễn Thị Thu Trang	Malaysia; Siti Nor Zubaidah Che Abd Wahab; Razman Anam; Kamisah Khamis
Double	Myanmar; Phyu Phyu Than; Khin Hnin Wai	Laos; Norkham Vongxay; Koy Xayavong	Vietnam; Dương Thị Xuyến; Nguyễn Thị Mỹ
Quard	Thailand; Masaya Duangsri; Somruedee Pruepruk; Wiphada Chitphuan; Sasiwimol Janthasit	Vietnam; Dương Thị Xuyến; Nguyễn Thị Mỹ; Nguyễn Thị Ngọc Huyền; Trần Thị Ngọc Yên	Myanmar; Ya Mong Zin; Nant Yin Yin Myint; Phyu Phyu Than; Khin Hnin Wai
Quard	Thailand; Masaya Duangsri; Somruedee Pruepruk; Wiphada Chitphuan; Sasiwimol Janthasit	Vietnam; Dương Thị Xuyến; Nguyễn Thị Mỹ; Nguyễn Thị Ngọc Huyền; Trần Thị Ngọc Yên	Laos; Norkham Vongxay; Koy Xayavong; Nouandam Volabouth; Sonsavan Keosouliya
