= Bodybuilding at the 2021 SEA Games =

- Venue: Hanoi Sports Training and Competition Centre
- Location: Hanoi, Vietnam
- Dates: 13–15 May 2022
- Nations: 5

The bodybuilding competitions at the 2021 SEA Games took place at Hanoi Sports Training and Competition Centre in Hanoi, Vietnam from 13 to 15 May 2022.

== Participating nations ==
- Laos
- Malaysia
- Myanmar
- Thailand
- Vietnam (host)

The Philippines also entered participants but were allegedly not able to fulfill prior competition requirements.

== Medal table ==
* Host nation (Vietnam)

Rank	Nation	Gold	Silver	Bronze	Total
1	Vietnam*	5	2	1	8
2	Thailand	3	3	3	9
3	Malaysia	1	3	4	8
4	Myanmar	1	2	1	4
5	Laos	0	0	1	1
Totals (5 entries)		10	10	10	30

== Medalists ==
Event	Gold	Silver	Bronze
Men's 55 kg	Phạm Văn Mách; Vietnam	Azri Asmat Sefri; Malaysia	Kyaw Min Than; Myanmar
Men's 60 kg	Jiraphan Pongkam; Thailand	Phạm Văn Phước; Vietnam	Kasem Rattanaporn; Thailand
Men's 65 kg	Đặng Thanh Tùng; Vietnam	Pongsiri Prommachan; Thailand	Malvern Abdullah; Malaysia
Men's 70 kg	Ye Htun Naung; Myanmar	Buda Anak Anchah; Malaysia	Sisomphou Phouthsavanh; Laos
Men's 75 kg	Trần Hoàng Duy Thuận; Vietnam	Zmarul Al Adam Pulutan Abdullah; Malaysia	Singthong Wichai; Thailand
Men's 80 kg	Sukthong Ekkaphon; Thailand	Min Zaw Oo; Myanmar	Zainal Arif Zainal Arifin; Malaysia
Men's 85 kg	Aphichai Wandee; Thailand	Khin Mg Kyaw; Myanmar	Muhammad Uzair Mat Noor; Malaysia
Men’s Athletic Physique	Mohd Syarul Azman Mahen Abdullah; Malaysia	Nguyễn Minh Tiến; Vietnam	Pong Pala; Thailand
Women’s Bodybuilding	Đinh Kim Loan; Vietnam	Jiratha Chuthanichaka; Thailand	Bùi Thị Thoa; Vietnam
Mixed Pairs	Vietnam (VIE); Trần Hoàng Duy Thuận; Bùi Thị Thoa	Thailand (THA); Wanchai Kanjanapimine; Siriporn Sornchuay	Malaysia (MAS); Malvern Abdullah; Shelen Aderina Kok
