= Kickboxing at the 2021 SEA Games =

Kickboxing at the 2021 Southeast Asian Games
- Venue: Bắc Ninh Multi-purpose Stadium
- Location: Bắc Ninh, Vietnam
- Dates: 8–13 May 2022

Kickboxing was among the sports contested at the 2021 SEA Games. There were twelve events in kickboxing held from 8 to 13 May 2022 at Bắc Ninh Multi-purpose Stadium in Bắc Ninh, Vietnam.

== Participating nations ==
- Cambodia
- Indonesia
- Laos
- Malaysia
- Philippines
- Singapore
- Thailand
- Vietnam (host)

== Medal table ==
* Host nation (Vietnam)

Rank	Nation	Gold	Silver	Bronze	Total
1	Vietnam*	5	0	6	11
2	Thailand	2	4	6	12
3	Philippines	2	4	2	8
4	Indonesia	2	1	1	4
5	Cambodia	1	3	1	5
6	Malaysia	0	0	5	5
7	Laos	0	0	2	2
Totals (7 entries)		12	12	23	47

== Medalists ==
=== Full contact ===
Event	Gold	Silver	Bronze
Men's 51 kg	Huỳnh Văn Tuấn; Vietnam	Salmri Stendra Pattisamallo; Indonesia	Mohammad Rifdean Masdor; Malaysia
Men's 51 kg	Huỳnh Văn Tuấn; Vietnam	Salmri Stendra Pattisamallo; Indonesia	Seksit Thimadee; Thailand
Men's 57 kg	Toch Rachnan; Cambodia	Arunno Sivapan; Thailand	Seaw Wei Sheng; Malaysia
Men's 57 kg	Toch Rachnan; Cambodia	Arunno Sivapan; Thailand	Thongbang Seuaphom; Laos
Men's 67 kg	Nguyễn Thế Hưởng; Vietnam	Lorn Panha; Cambodia	Rodnok Ophat; Thailand
Men's 67 kg	Nguyễn Thế Hưởng; Vietnam	Lorn Panha; Cambodia	Athachai Saiprawat; Malaysia
Women's 48 kg	Nguyễn Thị Hằng Nga; Vietnam	Renalyn Dacquel Dasalla; Philippines	Nadya Nakhoir; Indonesia
Women's 48 kg	Nguyễn Thị Hằng Nga; Vietnam	Renalyn Dacquel Dasalla; Philippines	Boonpeng Kanwara; Thailand
Women's 56 kg	Diandra Ariesta Pieter; Indonesia	Gretel De Paz Cordero; Philippines	Surachada Namrak; Thailand
Women's 56 kg	Diandra Ariesta Pieter; Indonesia	Gretel De Paz Cordero; Philippines	Lê Thị Nhi; Vietnam
Women's 65 kg	Huỳnh Thị Kim Vàng; Vietnam	Zephania Ngaya; Philippines	Jasita Yotawan; Thailand

=== Low kick ===
Event	Gold	Silver	Bronze
Men's 54 kg	Chaiwat Sungnoi; Thailand	Meng Hong Kan; Cambodia	Awangku Abdul Rahman; Malaysia
Men's 54 kg	Chaiwat Sungnoi; Thailand	Meng Hong Kan; Cambodia	Dương Danh Hoạt; Vietnam
Men's 60 kg	Nguyễn Quang Huy; Vietnam	Kampanart Valsiripattanachai; Thailand	Emmanuel Cantores Dailay; Philippines
Men's 60 kg	Nguyễn Quang Huy; Vietnam	Kampanart Valsiripattanachai; Thailand	Soukan Taipanyavong; Laos
Men's 63,5 kg	Jean Claude Saclag; Philippines	Chaleamlap Santidongsakun; Thailand	San Rakim; Cambodia
Men's 63,5 kg	Jean Claude Saclag; Philippines	Chaleamlap Santidongsakun; Thailand	Vũ Trường Giang; Vietnam
Men's 71 kg	Thongchai Thapphli; Thailand	Lvay Chhoeung; Cambodia	Honorio Banario Antonio; Philippines
Men's 71 kg	Thongchai Thapphli; Thailand	Lvay Chhoeung; Cambodia	Kiều Duy Quân; Vietnam
Women's 52 kg	Amanda La Loupatty; Indonesia	Claudine Veloso Decena; Philippines	Piamsuk Permkhunthod; Thailand
Women's 52 kg	Amanda La Loupatty; Indonesia	Claudine Veloso Decena; Philippines	Bùi Hải Linh; Vietnam
Women's 60 kg	Gina Araos Iniong; Philippines	Waraporn Jaiteang; Thailand	Đinh Thị Hoa; Vietnam
Women's 60 kg	Gina Araos Iniong; Philippines	Waraporn Jaiteang; Thailand	Hayatun Najihin Radzuan; Malaysia

== Results ==
=== Full contact ===
Men's 51 kg

Quarterfinals
(Cambodia) Khlaneang Kam	0
(Malaysia) Mohammad Rifdean Masdor	3
(Vietnam) Huỳnh Văn Tuấn	3
(Laos) Khamphouvanh Khamstahone	0
(Indonesia) Salmri Stendra Pattisamallo	3
(Philippines) Daryl Chutipas Fegcan	0

Semifinals
(Malaysia) Mohammad Rifdean Masdor	0
(Vietnam) Huỳnh Văn Tuấn	3
(Indonesia) Salmri Stendra Pattisamallo	2
(Thailand) Seksit Thimadee	1

Final
(Vietnam) Huỳnh Văn Tuấn	3
(Indonesia) Salmri Stendra Pattisamallo	0

Men's 57 kg

Quarterfinals
(Philippines) Esteban Jomar Balangui	1
(Cambodia) Toch Rachnan	2
(Thailand) Arunno Sivapan	2
(Vietnam) Nguyễn Xuân Phương	1

Semifinals
(Cambodia) Toch Rachnan	3
(Malaysia) Seaw Wei Sheng	0
(Thailand) Arunno Sivapan	3
(Laos) Thongbang Seuaphom	0

Final
(Cambodia) Toch Rachnan	3
(Thailand) Arunno Sivapan	0

Men's 67 kg

Quarterfinals
(Thailand) Rodnok Ophat	2
(Indonesia) Brian Alfa Ferdinand	1
(Vietnam) Nguyễn Thế Hưởng	3
(Philippines) Nehyeban Carlos Alvarez	0

Semifinals
(Thailand) Rodnok Ophat	1
(Cambodia) Panha Lorn	2
(Malaysia) Athachai Saiprawat	0
(Vietnam) Nguyễn Thế Hưởng	3

Final
(Cambodia) Panha Lorn	0
(Vietnam) Nguyễn Thế Hưởng	3

Women's 48 kg

Quarterfinals
(Malaysia) Teo Vireen	0
(Vietnam) Nguyễn Thị Hằng Nga	3

Semifinals
(Vietnam) Nguyễn Thị Hằng Nga	3
(Indonesia) Nadya Nakhoir	0
(Philippines) Renalyn Dacquel Dasalla	3
(Thailand) Boonpeng Kanwara	0

Final
(Vietnam) Nguyễn Thị Hằng Nga	3
(Philippines) Renalyn Dacquel Dasalla	0

Women's 56 kg

Quarterfinals
(Cambodia) Chanvotey Touch	0
(Thailand) Surachada Namrak	3

Semifinals
(Thailand) Surachada Namrak	1
(Philippines) Gretel De Paz Cordero	2
(Vietnam) Lê Thị Nhi	1
(Indonesia) Diandra Ariesta Pieter	2

Final
(Philippines) Gretel De Paz Cordero	0
(Indonesia) Diandra Ariesta Pieter	3

Women's 65kg

Quarterfinals	Semifinals		Final
	(Vietnam) Huỳnh Thị Kim Vàng	3
	(Thailand) Jasita Yotawan	0
			(Vietnam) Huỳnh Thị Kim Vàng	3
			(Philippines) Zephania Ngaya	0
	(Philippines) Zephania Ngaya
	Bye

=== Low kick ===
Men's 54 kg

Quarterfinals
(Laos) Houmphanh Khammaty	0
(Cambodia) Meng Hong Kan	3
(Philippines) Kurt Lubrica Ludan	1
(Thailand) Chaiwat Sungnoi	2

Semifinals
(Cambodia) Meng Hong Kan	2
(Malaysia) Awangku Abdul Rahman	1
(Vietnam) Dương Danh Hoạt	0
(Thailand) Chaiwat Sungnoi	3

Final
(Cambodia) Meng Hong Kan	0
(Thailand) Chaiwat Sungnoi	3

Men's 60 kg

Quarterfinals
(Malaysia) Ain Kamarrudin	0
(Philippines) Emmanuel Cantores Dailay	3
(Cambodia) Vannthong Chhut	0
(Vietnam) Nguyễn Quang Huy	3
(Thailand) Kampanart Valsiripattanachai	2
(Indonesia) Bonatua Lumbantungkup	1

Semifinals
(Philippines) Emmanuel Cantores Dailay	0
(Vietnam) Nguyễn Quang Huy	3
(Thailand) Kampanart Valsiripattanachai	2
(Laos) Soukan Taipanyavong	1

Final
(Vietnam) Nguyễn Quang Huy	3
(Thailand) Kampanart Valsiripattanachai	0

Men's 63.5 kg

Quarterfinals
(Thailand) Chaleamlap Santidongsakun	3
(Indonesia) Abdul Muis	0
(Cambodia) San Rakim	3
(Malaysia) Awang Handra Muhammad	0
(Philippines) Jean Claude Saclag	3
(Laos) Latxasak Souliyavong	0

Semifinals
(Thailand) Chaleamlap Santidongsakun	3
(Cambodia) San Rakim	0
(Vietnam) Vũ Trường Giang	0
(Philippines) Jean Claude Saclag	3

Final
(Thailand) Chaleamlap Santidongsakun	1
(Philippines) Jean Claude Saclag	2

Men's 71 kg

Quarterfinals
(Philippines) Honorio Banario Antonio	3
(Indonesia) Yermias Yohanes Tanoi	0
(Cambodia) Lvay Chhoeung	2
(Singapore) Muhammad Nazri Bin Sutari	1
(Laos) Khieosavath Damxoumphone	0
(Thailand) Thongchai Thapphli	3

Semifinals
(Philippines) Honorio Banario Antonio	0
(Cambodia) Lvay Chhoeung	3
(Vietnam) Kiều Duy Quân	1
(Thailand) Thongchai Thapphli	2

Final
(Cambodia) Lvay Chhoeung	1
(Thailand) Thongchai Thapphli	2

Women's 52 kg

Quarterfinals
(Laos) Mimi Yoysaykham	0
(Indonesia) Amanda La Loupatty	3
(Vietnam) Bùi Hải Linh	2
(Cambodia) Srey Pov Nao	1

Semifinals
(Indonesia) Amanda La Loupatty	2
(Thailand) Piamsuk Permkhunthod	1
(Philippines) Claudine Veloso Decena	3
(Vietnam) Bùi Hải Linh	0

Final
(Indonesia) Amanda La Loupatty	3
(Philippines) Claudine Veloso Decena	0

Women's 60 kg

Quarterfinals	Semifinals		Final
	(Vietnam) Đinh Thị Hoa	0
	(Thailand) Waraporn Jaiteang	3
			(Thailand) Waraporn Jaiteang	1
			(Philippines) Gina Araos Iniong	2
	(Malaysia) Hayatun Najihin Radzuan	0
	(Philippines) Gina Araos Iniong	3
