= Vovinam at the 2021 SEA Games =

- Venue: Sóc Sơn District Sporting Hall
- Location: Hanoi, Vietnam
- Dates: 18–22 May 2022

Vovinam competitions at the 2021 SEA Games took place at Sóc Sơn District Sporting Hall in Hanoi, Vietnam from 18 to 22 May 2022.

== Medal table ==
* Host nation (Vietnam)

Rank	Nation	Gold	Silver	Bronze	Total
1	Vietnam*	6	6	2	14
2	Myanmar	3	3	6	12
3	Cambodia	3	2	9	14
4	Laos	2	1	3	6
5	Indonesia	1	0	5	6
6	Thailand	0	2	3	5
7	Philippines	0	1	2	3
Totals (7 entries)		15	15	30	60

== Medalists ==
=== Performance ===
==== Men ====
Event	Gold	Silver	Bronze
Tứ tượng côn pháp (Four element staff)	Phailath Thammavongsa; Laos	Zaw Tin Htoo; Myanmar	Sean Chanhout; Cambodia
Tứ tượng côn pháp (Four element staff)	Phailath Thammavongsa; Laos	Zaw Tin Htoo; Myanmar	Kadek Dwi Dharmadi; Indonesia
Song luyện mã tấu (Dual machete)	Cambodia; Chin Piseth; Meth Sopheaktra	Vietnam; Trần Thế Thường; Lâm Đông Vượng	Indonesia; I Wayan Wisma Pratama Putra; Efrie Surya Perdana
Song luyện mã tấu (Dual machete)	Cambodia; Chin Piseth; Meth Sopheaktra	Vietnam; Trần Thế Thường; Lâm Đông Vượng	Myanmar; Yar Zan Tun; Zaw Tin Htoo
Đòn chân tấn công (Leg attack)	Myanmar; Hein Htet Aung; Kyaw Thu Soe Aung; Aung Khaing Linn; Yar Zar Tun	Vietnam; Mai Đình Chiến; Lê Phi Bảo; Nguyễn Quốc Cường; Nguyễn Hoàng Tấn	Cambodia; Boramey Ly; Socheat San; Bunlong Chren; Sopheaktra Meth
Đòn chân tấn công (Leg attack)	Myanmar; Hein Htet Aung; Kyaw Thu Soe Aung; Aung Khaing Linn; Yar Zar Tun	Vietnam; Mai Đình Chiến; Lê Phi Bảo; Nguyễn Quốc Cường; Nguyễn Hoàng Tấn	Laos; Phokham Phommachanh; Sommay Phangnivong; Philavanh Chanthakaly; Xaysana Hoanglokham
Tự vệ vũ khí nam (Weapon self-defence for men)	Myanmar; Zaw; Aik Soe Linn; Zin Lin Htun; Mana Kui	Vietnam; Đinh Thanh Đoàn; Nguyễn Hoàng Du; Lê Đức Duy; Huỳnh Khắc Nguyên	Cambodia; San Socheat; Chin Piseth; Chren Bunlong; Tiza Ny
Tự vệ vũ khí nam (Weapon self-defence for men)	Myanmar; Zaw; Aik Soe Linn; Zin Lin Htun; Mana Kui	Vietnam; Đinh Thanh Đoàn; Nguyễn Hoàng Du; Lê Đức Duy; Huỳnh Khắc Nguyên	Indonesia; I Nyoman Suryawan; I Wayan Sumertayasa; Dwi Gede Tomi Sanjaya; I Gusti Agung Gede Ary Wirawan

==== Women ====
Event	Gold	Silver	Bronze
Long Hổ quyền pháp (Dragon-tiger form)	Mai Thị Kim Thuỳ; Vietnam	Khine War Poo; Myanmar	Em Chankanika; Cambodia
Long Hổ quyền pháp (Dragon-tiger form)	Mai Thị Kim Thuỳ; Vietnam	Khine War Poo; Myanmar	Manik Trisna Dewi Wetan; Indonesia
Âm Dương kiếm pháp (Yin Yang sword)	Manik Trisna Dewi Wetan; Indonesia	May Haan Ni Aung Lwin; Myanmar	Nguyễn Thị Ngọc Trâm; Vietnam
Âm Dương kiếm pháp (Yin Yang sword)	Manik Trisna Dewi Wetan; Indonesia	May Haan Ni Aung Lwin; Myanmar	Sokha Pov; Cambodia
Song luyện quyền pháp (Dual form)	Myanmar; May Haan Ni Aung Lwin; Khine War Poo	Vietnam; Nguyễn Thị Hoài Nương; Nguyễn Thị Hiền	Cambodia; Chanleakhena Soeur; Sokha Pov
Song luyện quyền pháp (Dual form)	Myanmar; May Haan Ni Aung Lwin; Khine War Poo	Vietnam; Nguyễn Thị Hoài Nương; Nguyễn Thị Hiền	Laos; Koungking Bouddaxay; Mala Chanthalacksa
Song luyện kiếm pháp (Dual sword form)	Laos; Phiksamay Insoumang; Mala Chanthalacksa	Vietnam; Phạm Thị Bích Phượng; Trương Thạnh	Cambodia; Sokha Pov; Chanleakhena Soeur
Song luyện kiếm pháp (Dual sword form)	Laos; Phiksamay Insoumang; Mala Chanthalacksa	Vietnam; Phạm Thị Bích Phượng; Trương Thạnh	Thailand; Panyaporn Phaophan; Kanyarat Phaophan
Tự vệ vũ khí nữ (Weapon self-defence for women)	Cambodia; Chren Bunlong; Ly Boramey; Prak Sovanny	Vietnam; Lê Toàn Tùng; Lâm Trí Linh; Trần Tấn Lập	Indonesia; I Gusti Ngurah Agung Suardyana; Ni Made Ayu Ratih Daneswari; I Wayan Wisma Pratama Putra
Tự vệ vũ khí nữ (Weapon self-defence for women)	Cambodia; Chren Bunlong; Ly Boramey; Prak Sovanny	Vietnam; Lê Toàn Tùng; Lâm Trí Linh; Trần Tấn Lập	Laos; Phoutthasin Piengpanya; Phiksamay Insoumang; Phokham Phommachanh

=== Fighting ===
==== Men ====
Event	Gold	Silver	Bronze
–55 kg	Lê Hồng Tuấn; Vietnam	Wichian Sripaengpong; Thailand	Din Teh; Cambodia
–55 kg	Lê Hồng Tuấn; Vietnam	Wichian Sripaengpong; Thailand	Kyaw Ko Ko; Myanmar
–60 kg	Nguyễn Thanh Liêm; Vietnam	Sengsouly Chanthapanya; Laos	Ammarin Phouthong Eh; Cambodia
–60 kg	Nguyễn Thanh Liêm; Vietnam	Sengsouly Chanthapanya; Laos	Sirirot Sinchaitan; Thailand
–65 kg	Virekkaamchhitphouthong Eh; Cambodia	Carlo Von Bumina-ang; Philippines	Wai Thu Lwin; Myanmar
–65 kg	Virekkaamchhitphouthong Eh; Cambodia	Carlo Von Bumina-ang; Philippines	Đỗ Xuân Hiếu; Vietnam

==== Women ====
Event	Gold	Silver	Bronze
–55 kg	Phạm Thị Kiều Giang; Vietnam	Sophy Sok; Cambodia	Hnin Htet Wai; Myanmar
–55 kg	Phạm Thị Kiều Giang; Vietnam	Sophy Sok; Cambodia	Jenelyn Olsim Dasdas; Philippines
–60 kg	Lê Thị Hiền; Vietnam	Kesinee Tabtrai; Thailand	Shwe Htet Htar; Myanmar
–60 kg	Lê Thị Hiền; Vietnam	Kesinee Tabtrai; Thailand	Zephania Ngaya Pag-a; Philippines
–65 kg	Đỗ Phương Thảo; Vietnam	Somaly Chuk; Cambodia	Zin Mar Khaing; Myanmar
–65 kg	Đỗ Phương Thảo; Vietnam	Somaly Chuk; Cambodia	Tayida Kosonkitja; Thailand
