= Canoeing at the 2021 SEA Games =

Canoeing/Kayaking at the 2021 SEA Games
- Venue: Thủy Nguyên Boat Racing Center
- Location: Hải Phòng, Vietnam
- Dates: 17–21 May 2022

Canoeing and kayaking competitions at the 2021 SEA Games took place at Thủy Nguyên Boat Racing Center in Hải Phòng, Vietnam from 17 to 21 May 2022.

== Medal table ==
* Host nation (Vietnam)

Rank	Nation	Gold	Silver	Bronze	Total
1	Vietnam*	8	4	2	14
2	Indonesia	6	8	3	17
3	Thailand	3	6	6	15
4	Singapore	2	0	1	3
5	Myanmar	0	1	6	7
6	Philippines	0	0	1	1
Totals (6 entries)		19	19	19	57

== Medalists ==
=== Men ===
Event	Gold	Silver	Bronze
C-2 1000 m	Vietnam; Phạm Hồng Quân; Hiền Nam	Thailand; Piyawat Chaithong; Pitpiboon Mahawattanangkul	Philippines; Hermie Macaranas Salazar; Ojay Fuentes Franzuela
C-4 500 m	Indonesia; Anwar Tarra; Dedi Saputra; Sofiyanto; Yuda Firmansyah	Thailand; Mongkhonchai Sisong; Wittaya Hongkaeo; Piyawat Chaithong; Pitpiboon Mahawattanangkul	Myanmar; Myo Hlaing Win; Min Naing; Thant Zin Oo; Win Htike
C-4 1000 m	Vietnam; Phạm Hồng Quân; Hiền Nam; Trần Thanh; Nguyễn Quốc Toản	Indonesia; Sofiyanto; Dedi Saputra; Muhammad Burhan; Muhamad Yunus Rustandi	Myanmar; Min Naing; Thant Zin Oo; Sai Min Wai; Win Htike
K-1 1000 m	Lucas Teo; Singapore	Maizir Riyondra; Indonesia	Methasit Sitthipharat; Thailand
K-2 1000 m	Singapore; Brandon Ooi; Lucas Teo	Indonesia; Indra Hidayat; Irwan	Myanmar; Htet Wai Lwin; Myint Ko Ko
K-4 500 m	Indonesia; Andri Agus Mulyana; Joko Andriyanto; Mugi Harjito; Maizir Riyondra	Thailand; Aphisit Thamom; Methasit Sitthipharat; Praison Buasamrong; Aditep Srichart	Singapore; Jovi Jayden Kalaichelvan; Daniel Koh Teck Wai; Pan Chongchang; Brandon Ooi
K-4 1000 m	Indonesia; Tri Wahyu Buwono; Andri Agus Mulyana; Joko Andriyanto; Sutrisno	Myanmar; Tun Min Thant; Htet Wai Lwin; Myint Ko Ko; Saw Moe Aung	Vietnam; Trần Văn Vũ; Trần Văn Danh; Tống Hoàng Nam; Võ Duy Thanh

=== Women ===
Event	Gold	Silver	Bronze
C-1 200 m	Nguyễn Thị Hương; Vietnam	Orasa Thiangkathok; Thailand	Thet Phyo Naing; Myanmar
C-1 500 m	Nguyễn Thị Hương; Vietnam	Riska Andriyani; Indonesia	Orasa Thiangkathok; Thailand
C-1 1000 m	Nguyễn Thị Hương; Vietnam	Riska Andriyani; Indonesia	Thet Phyo Naing; Myanmar
C-2 500 m	Thailand; Aphinya Sroichit; Orasa Thiangkathok	Indonesia; Dayumin; Nur Meni	Vietnam; Trương Thị Phương; Nguyễn Thị Tuyết
C-2 1000 m	Vietnam; Trương Thị Phương; Nguyễn Thị Ngân	Thailand; Kawalin Takhianram; Aphinya Sroichit	Indonesia; Devita Safitri; Reski Wahyuni
C-4 200 m	Indonesia; Sella Monim; Riska Andriyani; Dayumin; Nur Meni	Thailand; Paweena Kamchon; Aphinya Sroichit; Orasa Thiangkathok; Suthimon Chuea Thamdee	Myanmar; Moe Ma Ma; Myint Myint Soe; Su Wai Phyo; Thet Phyo Naing
C-4 500 m	Vietnam; Nguyễn Thị Hương; Trương Thị Phương; Nguyễn Thị Ngân; Diệp Thị Hương	Indonesia; Sella Monim; Riska Andriyani; Dayumin; Nur Meni	Thailand; Paweena Kamchon; Nootchanat Thoongpong; Kewalin Takhianram; Suthimon Chuea Thamdee
C-4 1000 m	Vietnam; Nguyễn Thị Hương; Trương Thị Phương; Nguyễn Thị Tuyết; Diệp Thị Hương	Indonesia; Sella Monim; Ratih; Dayumin; Nur Meni	Thailand; Paweena Kamchon; Aphinya Sroichit; Orasa Thiangkathok; Suthimon Chuea Thamdee
K-2 500 m	Indonesia; Stevani Maysche Ibo; Raudani Fitra	Vietnam; Đỗ Thị Thanh Thảo; Đinh Thị Trang	Thailand; Panwad Thongnim; Kantida Nurun
K-2 1000 m	Thailand; Pornnapphan Phuangmaiming; Kantida Nurun	Vietnam; Đỗ Thị Thanh Thảo; Đinh Thị Trang	Indonesia; Cinta Priendtisca Nayomi; Raudani Fitra
K-4 500 m	Indonesia; Stevani Maysche Ibo; Ana Rahayu; Raudani Fitra; Cinta Priendtisca Nayom	Vietnam; Đỗ Thị Thanh Thảo; Ngô Phương Thảo; Lương Thị Dung; Ngô Thị Thu Hiền	Thailand; Suthasinee Autnun; Panwad Thongnim; Pornnapphan Phuangmaiming; Kantida Nurun
K-4 1000 m	Thailand; Suthasinee Autnun; Panwad Thongnim; Pornnapphan Phuangmaiming; Kantida Nurun	Vietnam; Đỗ Thị Thanh Thảo; Đinh Thị Trang; Ngô Phương Thảo; Nguyễn Thị Thanh Mai	Indonesia; Raudani Fitra; Cinta Priendtisca Nayomi; Stevani Maysche Ibo; Ana Rahayu
