= Chess at the 2013 SEA Games =

Chess at the 2013 Southeast Asian Games
- Venue: Zabu Thiri Hotel
- Location: Naypyidaw, Myanmar
- Dates: 12–21 December

Chess in the 27th Southeast Asian Games took place at Zabuthiri Hotel in Naypyidaw, Myanmar between December 12–21.

== Medal summary ==
=== Men ===
| Event | Gold | Silver | Bronze |
|---|---|---|---|
| International Rapid | Nguyễn Ngọc Trường Sơn; Vietnam | Nguyễn Đức Hòa; Vietnam | John Paul Gomez; Philippines |
| International Blitz | Nguyễn Ngọc Trường Sơn; Vietnam | Nguyễn Văn Huy; Vietnam | Rogelio Antonio Jr. Philippines |
| 960 Rapid | Susanto Megaranto; Indonesia | John Paul Gomez; Philippines | Nguyễn Ngọc Trường Sơn; Vietnam |
| ASEAN Standard | Uaychai Kongsee; Thailand | Boonsueb Sae Heng; Thailand | Nay Oo Kyaw Tun; Myanmar |
| ASEAN Rapid | Uaychai Kongsee; Thailand | Boonsueb Sae Heng; Thailand | Dede Lioe; Indonesia |
| ASEAN Rapid team | Thailand; Wisuwat Teerapabpaisit; Uaychai Kongsee; Danuphop Sangsuwan; Boonsueb Sae Heng | Philippines; Darwin Laylo; Eugene Torre; Rogelio Antonio Jr. John Paul Gomez | Myanmar; Win Tun; Nay Oo Kyaw Tun; Myint Han; Aung Myo Hlaing |
| ASEAN Blitz | Warot Kananub; Thailand | Uaychai Kongsee; Thailand | Taufik Halay; Indonesia |
| Traditional Standard | Nakorn Trisa-Ard; Thailand | Mohamad Ervan; Indonesia | Pairoj Suwan; Thailand |
| Traditional Rapid | Wynn Zaw Htun; Myanmar | Pairoj Suwan; Thailand | Worathep Timsri; Thailand |
| Traditional Rapid team | Thailand; Pairoj Suwan; Nut Sutthithamwasi; Chatuporn Lakarnchua; Worathep Timsri | Myanmar; Wynn Zaw Htun; Nyein Chan; Myint Han; Maung Maung Latt | Malaysia; Kugan Ravindran; Genkeswaran Muniyan; Mok Tze Meng; Mok Khye Zen |
| Traditional Blitz | Wynn Zaw Htun; Myanmar | Worathep Timsri; Thailand | Taufik Halay; Indonesia |
| Traditional Blitz team | Thailand; Supat Lekcham; Nut Sutthithamwasi; Arch Boonruamboon; Worathep Timsri | Indonesia; Mohamad Ervan; Taufik Halay; Lioe Dede | Myanmar; Zaw Win; Wynn Zaw Htun; Nay Oo Kyaw Tun; Maung Maung Latt |
| Pair Transfer Blitz | Indonesia; Muhammad Lutfi Ali; Susanto Megaranto | Vietnam; Đào Thiên Hải; Nguyễn Văn Huy | Indonesia; Farid Firman Syah; Masruri Rahman |

=== Women ===
| Event | Gold | Silver | Bronze |
|---|---|---|---|
| International Rapid | Irene Kharisma Sukandar; Indonesia | Phạm Lê Thảo Nguyên; Vietnam | Medina Warda Aulia; Indonesia |
| International Blitz | Irene Kharisma Sukandar; Indonesia | Hoàng Thị Bảo Trâm; Vietnam | Medina Warda Aulia; Indonesia |
| ASEAN Rapid team | Myanmar; Su Su Hlaing; Soe Moe Khine; May Hsu Lwin; May Hset Lwin | Indonesia; Dewi Ardhiani Anastasia Citra; Nadya Anggraini Mukmin; Chelsie Monica Ignesias Sihite; Dita Karenza | Thailand; Janpen Chamsub; Chanida Taweesupmun; Chananchida Vongvastana; Chitaporn Pratuengsukpong |
| Traditional Rapid team | Myanmar; Su Su Hlaing; May Su Thwe; May Hsu Lwin; May Hset Lwin | Indonesia; Dewi Ardhiani Anastasia Citra; Nadya Anggraini Mukmin; Chelsie Monica Ignesias Sihite; Dita Karenza | Thailand; Ruja Phitchayarom; Koranan Laorchem; Korada Bootchon; Manunthon Atikankhotchasee |

=== Mixed doubles ===
| Event | Gold | Silver | Bronze |
|---|---|---|---|
| Pair Transfer Blitz | Indonesia; Muhammad Lutfi Ali; Chelsie Monica Ignesias Sihite | Vietnam; Hoàng Thị Như Ý Đào Thiên Hải | Indonesia; Dewi Ardhiani Anastasia Citra; Susanto Megaranto |

== Medal table ==
* Host nation (Myanmar)

| Rank | Nation | Gold | Silver | Bronze | Total |
|---|---|---|---|---|---|
| 1 | Thailand (THA) | 7 | 5 | 4 | 16 |
| 2 | Indonesia (INA) | 5 | 4 | 7 | 16 |
| 3 | Myanmar (MYA)* | 4 | 1 | 3 | 8 |
| 4 | Vietnam (VIE) | 2 | 6 | 1 | 9 |
| 5 | Philippines (PHI) | 0 | 2 | 2 | 4 |
| 6 | Malaysia (MAS) | 0 | 0 | 1 | 1 |
| 7 | Brunei (BRU) | 0 | 0 | 0 | 0 |
| 7 | Cambodia (CAM) | 0 | 0 | 0 | 0 |
| 7 | Laos (LAO) | 0 | 0 | 0 | 0 |
| 7 | Singapore (SIN) | 0 | 0 | 0 | 0 |
| 7 | Timor-Leste (TLS) | 0 | 0 | 0 | 0 |
| Totals (11 entries) | | 18 | 18 | 18 | 54 |
