= 2026 Asian Table Tennis Championships – Women's singles =

Women's singles at the 2026 Asian Table Tennis Championships
- Venue: Olimpiya shaharchasi
- Date: 19–25 October 2026
- Competitors: 100 from 26 nations

The Women's singles at the 2026 Asian Table Tennis Championships will be held in Tashkent, Uzbekistan from 19 to 25 October 2026.

== Format and Qualification ==
The tournament is played in a straight single-elimination knockout format. All matches across all stages of the competition are played as a best-of-five (5) games.

Seedings for the draw are determined by ITTF World Ranking (Week 42).

=== 2027 World Championships Qualification ===
This event serves as the official Asian qualification tournament for the 2027 World Table Tennis Championships. Asia has been allocated a total of 32 continental quotas for Women's singles. The 32 winners of round of 64 can automatically qualify and there is no qualification matches to play.

== Match Summary ==
=== Round of 32 ===
Number 8 seed Shi Xunyao from China suffers early exit (Round of 32) in two consecutive editions. She was stunned by Korea Republic's debutant Lee Daeun 3-2, who subsequently reached the quarterfinals before falling to 2024 finalist Miwa Harimoto.

=== Quarterfinals ===
Kuai Man and Chen Yi are the debutants of this event, and they capture their first singles' medal in Asian Championship.

Kuai Man captures her first win over Japanese defender Honoka Hashimoto 3-1.

Chen Yi beats Hina Hayata 3-0, and extends their head to head record to 4-0.

=== Semifinals + Final ===
China's debutant Chen Yi beats her teammate Wang Yidi 3-0 in the semifinal. Chen enters Final for the first time in this event.

2024 Finalist Miwa Harimoto enters the final by beating another Chinese debutant Kuai Man 3-2 after trailing 0-2. Miwa enters Final for two consecutive editions.

During the Final, Chen Yi dominates Miwa Harimoto by 3-0, ending her streak losing to Miwa and claiming her first gold medal in Women singles. Miwa captures silver for two consecutive editions.

== Seeds ==
- Seeding was determined by the International Table Tennis Federation world rankings released on October 12, 2026.

1. (Japan) Miwa Harimoto
2. (China) Wang Yidi
3. (China) Kuai Man
4. (Japan) Hina Hayata
5. (China) Chen Yi
6. (Japan) Satsuki Odo
7. (Japan) Honoka Hashimoto
8. (China) Shi Xunyao
9. (Japan) Miyu Nagasaki
10. (China) Qin Yuxuan
11. (Chinese Taipei) Peng Yu-han
12. (Hong Kong) Doo Hoi Kem
13. (Chinese Taipei) Yeh Yi-tian
14. (Singapore) Zeng Jian
15. (Thailand) Orawan Paranang
16. (South Korea) Lee Eun-hye
17. (Chinese Taipei) Chien Tung-chuan
18. (Hong Kong) Su Tsz Tung
19. (Singapore) Ser Lin Qian
20. (India) Yashaswini Ghorpade
21. (Hong Kong) Ng Wing Lam
22. (Kazakhstan) Zauresh Akasheva
23. (India) Syndrela Das
24. (South Korea) Park Gahyeon
25. (Singapore) Tan Zhao Yun
26. (Singapore) Loy Ming Ying
27. (South Korea) Lee Daeun
28. (Malaysia) Karen Lyne
29. (India) Swastika Ghosh
30. (Malaysia) Chang Li Sian
31. (Malaysia) Tee Ai Xin
32. (Chinese Taipei) Wu Ying-syuan

== Main Draw ==
=== Finals ===
Quarterfinals
1	(Japan) Harimoto M.	11	11	11
27	(South Korea) Lee D.	3	7	9
7	(Japan) Hashimoto H.	6	7	11	5
3	(China) Kuai M.	11	11	4	11
4	(Japan) Hayata H.	5	3	7
5	(China) Chen Y.	11	11	11
6	(Japan) Odo S.	11	9	7	6
2	(China) Wang Y.	7	11	11	11

Semifinals
1	(Japan) Harimoto M.	7	11	11	11	12
3	(China) Kuai M. (bronze)	11	13	5	9	10
5	(China) Chen Y.	11	11	11
2	(China) Wang Y. (bronze)	7	8	9

Final
1	(Japan) Harimoto M. (silver)	5	8	6
5	(China) Chen Y. (gold)	11	11	11

=== Top half ===
==== Section 1 ====
Round of 128
(Uzbekistan) Gulimova M.	7	10	6
(Mongolia) Batmunkh B.	11	12	11
(Qatar) Mohamed A.	7	6	12
(Indonesia) Nebuchadnezzar A.	11	11	14
(Thailand) Sawettabut J.	14	11	10	8	9
21	(Hong Kong) Ng W. L.	12	6	12	11	11
(Iran) Shahsavari N.	11	11	11
(Macau) Seak H. L.	6	7	5
(Kazakhstan) Mirkadirova S.	11	11	9	11
(Tajikistan) Ismailova D.	9	5	11	4

Round of 64
1	(Japan) Harimoto M.	11	11	11
(Mongolia) Batmunkh B.	0	3	4
(Indonesia) Nebuchadnezzar A.	1	11	8	11	7
21	(Hong Kong) Ng W. L.	11	9	11	9	11
28	(Malaysia) Lyne K.	13	6	11	11
(Iran) Shahsavari N.	11	11	9	5
(Kazakhstan) Mirkadirova S.	8	3	7
14	(Singapore) Zeng J.	11	11	11

Round of 32
1	(Japan) Harimoto M.	9	11	11	12
21	(Hong Kong) Ng W. L.	11	0	5	10
28	(Malaysia) Lyne K.	11	11	7	2
14	(Singapore) Zeng J.	9	13	11	11

Round of 16
1	(Japan) Harimoto M.	11	13	11
14	(Singapore) Zeng J.	6	11	5

==== Section 2 ====
Round of 128
(Azerbaijan) Azizova N.	3	4	7
(Sri Lanka) Bandara B.	11	11	11
(Jordan) Sadaqa Z.	6	6	12	6
(Uzbekistan) Khasanova A.	11	11	10	11
(Kyrgyzstan) Abdimitalipova R.	1	3	8
(Hong Kong) Kong T. L.	11	11	11
(Kuwait) Alshammari M.	7	6	6
(Philippines) Gudes A.	11	11	11

Round of 64
15	(Thailand) Paranang O.	11	11	11
(Sri Lanka) Bandara B.	4	8	3
(Uzbekistan) Khasanova A.	3	8	8
32	(Chinese Taipei) Wu Y. S.	11	11	11
27	(South Korea) Lee D.	11	11	11
(Hong Kong) Kong T. L.	3	5	6
(Philippines) Gudes A.	5	5	2
8	(China) Shi X.	11	11	11

Round of 32
15	(Thailand) Paranang O.	11	7	11	13
32	(Chinese Taipei) Wu Y. S.	5	11	5	11
27	(South Korea) Lee D.	11	4	11	6	11
8	(China) Shi X.	9	11	4	11	7

Round of 16
15	(Thailand) Paranang O.	5	12	9	5
27	(South Korea) Lee D.	11	10	11	11

==== Section 3 ====
Round of 128
(Uzbekistan) Kamalova A.	13	11	6	11
(Maldives) Nafiz A.	11	8	11	4
(Kazakhstan) Romanovskaya A.	11	9	11	11
(Philippines) Fadol R. J.	5	11	9	9
(Macau) Chong I. T.	9	10	6
(Kyrgyzstan) Aiazbekova N.	11	12	11
(Tajikistan) Saidbekova H.	3	11	8	6
(Bangladesh) Mou S.	11	8	11	11

Round of 64
7	(Japan) Hashimoto H.	11	11	11
(Uzbekistan) Kamalova A.	3	1	3
(Kazakhstan) Romanovskaya A.	4	5	4
25	(Singapore) Tan Z. Y.	11	11	11
24	(South Korea) Park G.	11	11	11
(Kyrgyzstan) Aiazbekova N.	4	5	2
(Bangladesh) Mou S.	4	6	5
12	(Hong Kong) Doo H.	11	11	11

Round of 32
7	(Japan) Hashimoto H.	11	11	11
25	(Singapore) Tan Z. Y.	7	5	1
24	(South Korea) Park G.	9	11	9	11	11
12	(Hong Kong) Doo H.	11	7	11	9	6

Round of 16
7	(Japan) Hashimoto H.	11	11	11
24	(South Korea) Park G.	4	6	3

==== Section 4 ====
Round of 128
(Singapore) Lai C.	11	2	11	11
(Indonesia) Sudarnita K.	5	11	8	9
(Mongolia) Ser-Od A.	6	6	6
(Iran) Yariseraji F.	11	11	11
31	(Malaysia) Tee A. X.	11	11	11
(Sri Lanka) Alagiyawadu T. K.	6	6	6
(Philippines) Santillan C.	11	11	11
(Turkmenistan) Ballyyeva E.	5	8	6
(Qatar) Abdulraheem M.	2	1	6
(Thailand) Sawettabut S.	11	11	11

Round of 64
11	(Chinese Taipei) Peng Y. H.	11	11	11
(Singapore) Lai C.	5	6	3
(Iran) Yariseraji F.	11	11	2	4	6
23	(India) Das S.	8	9	11	11	11
31	(Malaysia) Tee A. X.	7	11	5	11	11
(Philippines) Santillan C.	11	9	11	7	6
(Thailand) Sawettabut S.	11	6	10	8
3	(China) Kuai M.	8	11	12	11

Round of 32
11	(Chinese Taipei) Peng Y. H.	15	11	11	5	6
23	(India) Das S.	17	7	5	11	11
31	(Malaysia) Tee A. X.	7	9	11	9
3	(China) Kuai M.	11	11	9	11

Round of 16
23	(India) Das S.	5	7	3
3	(China) Kuai M.	11	11	11

=== Bottom half ===
==== Section 5 ====
Round of 128
(Uzbekistan) Erkebaeva A.	11	11	11
(Macau) Huang C. L.	4	9	3
(Uzbekistan) Sharipova P.	3	7	11	7
(Bangladesh) Sai K.	11	11	8	11
(Jordan) Abedali J.	4	4	3
29	(India) Ghosh S.	11	11	11
(Jordan) El-Hasani R.	2	3	5
(South Korea) Yoo S.	11	11	11
(Indonesia) Rasmi C.	11	13	7	9	9
(Malaysia) Li Y. I.	6	11	11	11	11

Round of 64
4	(Japan) Hayata H.	11	11	11
(Uzbekistan) Erkebaeva A.	5	6	4
(Bangladesh) Sai K.	6	5	3
29	(India) Ghosh S.	11	11	11
18	(Hong Kong) Su T. T.	11	11	9	11
(South Korea) Yoo S.	4	7	11	6
(Malaysia) Li Y. I.	4	4	12	7
9	(Japan) Nagasaki M.	11	11	10	11

Round of 32
4	(Japan) Hayata H.	11	11	11
29	(India) Ghosh S.	8	6	4
18	(Hong Kong) Su T. T.	11	4	11	11	5
9	(Japan) Nagasaki M.	7	11	13	7	11

Round of 16
4	(Japan) Hayata H.	13	11	10	12
9	(Japan) Nagasaki M.	11	8	12	10

==== Section 6 ====
Round of 128
(Thailand) Wonglakhon P.	11	12	3	10	11
(Mongolia) Tuvshinbayar E.	5	10	11	12	4
(Uzbekistan) Kudusova S.	8	5	2
(Kazakhstan) Koshkumbayeva Z.	11	11	11
(Philippines) Cruz K.	11	11	11
(Sri Lanka) Halawathage S.	6	5	6
(Maldives) Ibrahim M.	2	4	8
(Iran) Iloukhani S.	11	11	11

Round of 64
10	(China) Qin Y.	11	11	11
(Thailand) Wonglakhon P.	7	3	4
(Kazakhstan) Koshkumbayeva Z.	11	4	6
26	(Singapore) Loy M. Y.	13	11	11
17	(Chinese Taipei) Chien T. C.	11	12	11
(Philippines) Cruz K.	9	10	5
(Iran) Iloukhani S.	3	12	3	8
5	(China) Chen Y.	11	10	11	11

Round of 32
10	(China) Qin Y.	11	11	14
26	(Singapore) Loy M. Y.	9	9	12
17	(Chinese Taipei) Chien T. C.	2	2	8
5	(China) Chen Y.	11	11	11

Round of 16
10	(China) Qin Y.	13	8	4
5	(China) Chen Y.	15	11	11

==== Section 7 ====
Round of 128
(Philippines) Laude A. J.	11	11	11
(Maldives) Malaak M.	6	5	5
(Chinese Taipei) Chen S. Y.	11	11	11
(Macau) Leong I. N.	4	3	4
(Uzbekistan) Elmurodova M.	11	0	11	8	11
(Jordan) Khader B.	7	11	5	11	6
(Thailand) Vijitviriyagul K.	11	10	11	11
(Iran) Rahimi E.	3	12	8	7

Round of 64
6	(Japan) Odo S.	11	11	11
(Philippines) Laude A. J.	5	8	3
(Chinese Taipei) Chen S. Y.	11	6	11	11
22	(Kazakhstan) Akasheva Z.	9	11	9	9
30	(Malaysia) Chang L. S.	11	11	11
(Uzbekistan) Elmurodova M.	6	3	2
(Thailand) Vijitviriyagul K.	9	3	9
16	(South Korea) Lee E.	11	11	11

Round of 32
6	(Japan) Odo S.
(Chinese Taipei) Chen S. Y.
30	(Malaysia) Chang L. S.	11	11	4	12	9
16	(South Korea) Lee E.	13	5	11	10	11

Round of 16
6	(Japan) Odo S.	11	10	12	11
16	(South Korea) Lee E.	6	12	10	5

==== Section 8 ====
Round of 128
(Sri Lanka) Gusthighgha W.	8	12	10	11	11
(Tajikistan) Samadova M.	11	10	12	8	5
(South Korea) Lee Z.	12	11	11
(Singapore) Aminah S.	10	3	6
19	(Singapore) Ser L. Q.	11	11	11
(Bangladesh) Soma S.	5	3	1
(Saudi Arabia) Alqahtani N.
(Iran) Ashtari M. (w/o)
(Kyrgyzstan) Muratalieva R.	5	3	2
(Hong Kong) Lee H. M.	11	11	11

Round of 64
13	(Chinese Taipei) Yeh Y. T.	11	11	11
(Sri Lanka) Gusthighgha W.	5	3	3
(South Korea) Lee Z.	11	11	11
20	(India) Ghorpade Y.	3	8	9
19	(Singapore) Ser L. Q.	6	6	10
(Iran) Ashtari M.	11	11	12
(Hong Kong) Lee H. M.	2	3	4
2	(China) Wang Y.	11	11	11

Round of 32
13	(Chinese Taipei) Yeh Y. T.	7	8	8
(South Korea) Lee Z.	11	11	11
(Iran) Ashtari M.	8	8	1
2	(China) Wang Y.	11	11	11

Round of 16
(South Korea) Lee Z.	9	8	10
2	(China) Wang Y.	11	11	12
