= Table tennis at the 2026 Asian Games – Women's team =

Women's team at the 2026 Asian Games
- Venue: Sky Hall Toyota
- Date: 20–24 September 2026
- Competitors: 86 from 20 nations

Medalists
gold medal	China; Sun Yingsha, Wang Manyu, Kuai Man, Chen Yi, Fan Shuhan
silver medal	Japan; Miwa Harimoto, Hina Hayata, Mima Ito, Miyu Nagasaki, Rin Mende
bronze medal	South Korea; Shin Yu-bin, Joo Cheon-hui, Kim Na-yeong, Lee Eun-hye, Park Ga-hyeon
bronze medal	North Korea; Kim Kum Yong, Pyon Song Gyong, Cha Su Yong, Choe Jong Im

The women's team table tennis event at the 2026 Asian Games took place from 20 to 24 September 2026 at the Sky Hall Toyota. China won the gold medal, defeating host nation Japan 3–0 in the final to claim their sixth consecutive and twelfth overall Asian Games title.

== Schedule ==
All times are Japan Standard Time (UTC+09:00)

Date	Time	Event
Sunday, 20 September 2026	10:00	Preliminary 1
Sunday, 20 September 2026	16:00	Preliminary 2
Monday, 21 September 2026	10:00	Preliminary 3
Tuesday, 22 September 2026	10:00	Round of 16
Tuesday, 22 September 2026	19:20	Quarterfinals
Wednesday, 23 September 2026	17:00	Semifinals
Thursday, 24 September 2026	19:30	Final

== Results ==
=== Preliminary ===
==== Group A ====
Pos	Team	Pld	W	L	MF	MA	Pts	Qualification
1	China	2	2	0	6	1	4	Quarterfinals
2	Macau	2	1	1	4	4	3	Round of 16
3	Nepal	2	0	2	1	6	2	

Source: Official website

20 September	China	3–0	Nepal

Chen Yi	3–0	Evana Thapa	11–1, 11–6, 11–5
Kuai Man	3–0	Nabita Shrestha	11–4, 11–3, 11–4
Fan Shuhan	3–0	Yonggi Poudel	11–1, 11–5, 11–1
Chen Yi		Nabita Shrestha	not played
Kuai Man		Evana Thapa	not played

20 September	Macau	1–3	China

Zhu Yuling	3–1	Wang Manyu	11–9, 11–9, 7–11, 13–11
Leong On-na	0–3	Sun Yingsha	3–11, 2–11, 2–11
Kuan Cheok	0–3	Kuai Man	3–11, 5–11, 2–11
Zhu Yuling	0–3	Sun Yingsha	5–11, 7–11, 1–11
Leong On-na		Wang Manyu	not played

21 September	Macau	3–1	Nepal

Zhu Yuling	3–0	Evana Thapa	11–2, 11–1, 11–3
Kuan Cheok	2–3	Nabita Shrestha	11–4, 11–3, 9–11, 7–11, 9–11
Leong On-na	3–1	Yonggi Poudel	11–5, 11–4, 9–11, 11–2
Zhu Yuling	3–0	Nabita Shrestha	11–2, 11–4, 11–5
Kuan Cheok		Evana Thapa	not played

==== Group B ====
Pos	Team	Pld	W	L	MF	MA	Pts	Qualification
1	Japan	2	2	0	6	0	4	Quarterfinals
2	Uzbekistan	2	1	1	3	4	3	Round of 16
3	Mongolia	2	0	2	1	6	2	

Source: Official website

20 September	Japan	3–0	Mongolia

Miwa Harimoto	3–0	Burenjargal Sanjaa	11–3, 11–4, 11–1
Mima Ito	3–0	Bolor-erdene Batmunkh	11–8, 11–5, 11–4
Miyu Nagasaki	3–0	Bolor-egshiglen Batmunkh	11–2, 11–7, 11–2
Miwa Harimoto		Bolor-erdene Batmunkh	not played
Mima Ito		Burenjargal Sanjaa	not played

20 September	Uzbekistan	0–3	Japan

Arujan Kamalova	0–3	Miyu Nagasaki	3–11, 1–11, 5–11
Asel Erkebaeva	0–3	Hina Hayata	5–11, 5–11, 7–11
Adelina Khasanova	0–3	Rin Mende	8–11, 5–11, 4–11
Arujan Kamalova		Hina Hayata	not played
Asel Erkebaeva		Miyu Nagasaki	not played

21 September	Uzbekistan	3–1	Mongolia

Asel Erkebaeva	3–1	Ankhmaa Ser-Od	11–1, 4–11, 11–8, 11–4
Adelina Khasanova	1–3	Bolor-erdene Batmunkh	9–11, 11–4, 7–11, 9–11
Arujan Kamalova	3–0	Burenjargal Sanjaa	11–6, 11–6, 11–1
Asel Erkebaeva	3–0	Bolor-erdene Batmunkh	11–8, 11–3, 11–9
Adelina Khasanova		Ankhmaa Ser-Od	not played

==== Group C ====
Pos	Team	Pld	W	L	MF	MA	Pts	Qualification
1	South Korea	2	2	0	6	0	4	Quarterfinals
2	Kazakhstan	2	1	1	3	4	3	Round of 16
3	Maldives	2	0	2	1	6	2	

Source: Official website

20 September	South Korea	3–0	Maldives

Joo Cheon-hui	3–0	Aishath Nazim	11–2, 11–2, 11–7
Kim Na-yeong	3–0	Fathimath Ali	11–7, 11–6, 11–4
Lee Eun-hye	3–0	Mishka Ibrahim	11–3, 11–2, 11–4
Joo Cheon-hui		Fathimath Ali	not played
Kim Na-yeong		Aishath Nazim	not played

20 September	South Korea	3–0	Kazakhstan

Shin Yubin	3–0	Zauresh Akasheva	11–6, 11–2, 11–6
Joo Cheon-hui	3–0	Sarvinoz Mirkadirova	11–3, 11–2, 11–5
Kim Na-yeong	3–1	Zhanerke Koshkumbayeva	6–11, 11–5, 11–4, 11–7
Shin Yubin		Sarvinoz Mirkadirova	not played
Joo Cheon-hui		Zauresh Akasheva	not played

21 September	Maldives	1–3	Kazakhstan

Fathimath Ali	3–1	Zhanerke Koshkumbayeva	12–10, 5–11, 11–5, 13–11
Aishath Nazim	1–3	Zauresh Akasheva	3–11, 2–11, 11–8, 5–11
Aishath Nafiz	0–3	Sarvinoz Mirkadirova	5–11, 7–11, 5–11
Fathimath Ali	0–3	Zauresh Akasheva	6–11, 3–11, 9–11
Aishath Nazim		Zhanerke Koshkumbayeva	not played

==== Group D ====
Pos	Team	Pld	W	L	MF	MA	Pts	Qualification
1	North Korea	2	2	0	6	1	4	Quarterfinals
2	Chinese Taipei	2	1	1	4	3	3	Round of 16
3	Bangladesh	2	0	2	0	6	2	

Source: Official website

20 September	Bangladesh	0–3	Chinese Taipei

Sonam Soma	0–3	Yeh Yi-tian	4–11, 3–11, 2–11
Nowrin Mahi	0–3	Cheng I-ching	2–11, 4–11, 1–11
Samanta Tushi	0–3	Peng Yu-han	4–11, 2–11, 7–11
Sonam Soma		Cheng I-ching	not played
Nowrin Mahi		Yeh Yi-tian	not played

20 September	North Korea	3–1	Chinese Taipei

Kim Kum Yong	3–1	Peng Yu-han	11–6, 11–8, 13–15, 12–10
Pyon Song	3–1	Cheng I-ching	11–5, 11–13, 11–7, 14–12
Cha Su Yong	2–3	Yeh Yi-tian	10–12, 5–11, 13–11, 11–5, 10–12
Kim Kum Yong	3–1	Cheng I-ching	11–6, 11–4, 5–11, 11–8
Pyon Song		Peng Yu-han	not played

21 September	North Korea	3–0	Bangladesh

Kim Kum Yong	3–0	Samanta Tushi	11–4, 11–2, 11–1
Pyon Song	3–0	Sonam Soma	11–2, 11–6, 11–3
Choe Jong Im	3–0	Nowrin Mahi	11–4, 11–5, 11–1
Kim Kum Yong		Sonam Soma	not played
Pyon Song		Samanta Tushi	not played

==== Group E ====
Pos	Team	Pld	W	L	MF	MA	Pts	Qualification
1	Hong Kong	3	3	0	9	2	6	Round of 16
2	Thailand	3	2	1	8	3	5	Round of 16
3	Lebanon	3	1	2	3	8	4	
4	Qatar	3	0	3	2	9	3	

Source: Official website

20 September	Hong Kong	3–0	Lebanon

Doo Hoi Kem	3–0	Talia Azar	11–6, 11–3, 11–4
Su Tsz Tung	3–0	Bissan Chiri	11–3, 11–2, 11–1
Ng Wing Lam	3–1	Laetitia Azar	11–13, 11–5, 11–2, 11–4
Doo Hoi Kem		Bissan Chiri	not played
Su Tsz Tung		Talia Azar	not played

20 September	Qatar	0–3	Thailand

Aia Mohamed	0–3	Orawan Paranang	6–11, 6–11, 6–11
Maryam Ali	0–3	Suthasini Sawettabut	4–11, 1–11, 4–11
Sarrinah Shaikh	0–3	Jinnipa Sawettabut	5–11, 4–11, 3–11
Aia Mohamed		Suthasini Sawettabut	not played
Maryam Ali		Orawan Paranang	not played

20 September	Hong Kong	3–2	Thailand

Doo Hoi Kem	3–0	Suthasini Sawettabut	11–7, 16–14, 13–11
Su Tsz Tung	3–2	Orawan Paranang	10–12, 12–10, 5–11, 11–9, 11–6
Ng Wing Lam	2–3	Phatsaraphon Wonglakhon	11–8, 10–12, 11–5, 4–11, 9–11
Doo Hoi Kem	2–3	Orawan Paranang	10–12, 11–6, 13–15, 11–8, 7–11
Su Tsz Tung	3–0	Suthasini Sawettabut	11–6, 11–4, 11–4

20 September	Qatar	2–3	Lebanon

Aia Mohamed	0–3	Talia Azar	4–11, 8–11, 9–11
Sarrinah Shaikh	3–2	Laetitia Azar	11–5, 9–11, 5–11, 11–6, 11–7
Maryam Ali	1–3	Bissan Chiri	11–6, 7–11, 5–11, 11–13
Aia Mohamed	3–2	Laetitia Azar	11–6, 11–3, 9–11, 9–11, 12–10
Sarrinah Shaikh	2–3	Talia Azar	12–10, 2–11, 8–11, 11–5, 7–11

21 September	Thailand	3–0	Lebanon

Jinnipa Sawettabut	3–0	Laetitia Azar	11–2, 11–1, 11–5
Kulapassr Vijitviriyagul	3–0	Talia Azar	11–4, 11–2, 11–3
Phatsaraphon Wonglakhon	3–0	Bissan Chiri	11–4, 11–8, 11–5
Jinnipa Sawettabut		Talia Azar	not played
Kulapassr Vijitviriyagul		Laetitia Azar	not played

21 September	Hong Kong	3–0	Qatar

Lee Hoi Man Karen	3–0	Aia Mohamed	11–8, 11–7, 11–3
Lam Yee Lok	3–0	Sarrinah Shaikh	11–3, 11–1, 11–3
Ng Wing Lam	3–0	Fawziya Al-Malki	11–5, 11–3, 11–4
Lee Hoi Man Karen		Sarrinah Shaikh	not played
Lam Yee Lok		Aia Mohamed	not played

==== Group F ====
Pos	Team	Pld	W	L	MF	MA	Pts	Qualification
1	India	3	3	0	9	2	6	Round of 16
2	Singapore	3	2	1	8	3	5	Round of 16
3	Indonesia	3	1	2	3	6	4	
4	Pakistan	3	0	3	0	9	3	

Source: Official website

20 September	Singapore	3–0	Pakistan

Ser Lin Qian	3–0	Aleena Khan	11–3, 11–4, 11–1
Loy Ming Ying	3–0	Kalsoom Khan	11–2, 11–1, 11–3
Chloe Lai	3–0	Nosheen Aslam	11–1, 11–3, 11–2
Ser Lin Qian		Kalsoom Khan	not played
Loy Ming Ying		Aleena Khan	not played

20 September	India	3–0	Indonesia

Sreeja Akula	3–1	Maharani Ni	11–3, 8–11, 11–4, 11–4
Diya Chitale	3–0	Almaira Nebuchadnezzar	11–9, 11–8, 11–5
Yashaswini Ghorpade	3–0	Citra Rasmi	12–10, 11–4, 11–4
Sreeja Akula		Almaira Nebuchadnezzar	not played
Diya Chitale		Maharani Ni	not played

20 September	Singapore	2–3	India

Jian Zeng	1–3	Yashaswini Ghorpade	7–11, 3–11, 11–8, 9–11
Loy Ming Ying	3–2	Sreeja Akula	11–8, 4–11, 11–9, 4–11, 11–6
Zhao Tan	3–1	Diya Chitale	11–7, 11–4, 7–11, 11–5
Jian Zeng	1–3	Sreeja Akula	11–6, 3–11, 7–11, 4–11
Loy Ming Ying	2–3	Yashaswini Ghorpade	11–5, 8–11, 10–12, 11–4, 9–11

20 September	Indonesia	3–0	Pakistan

Almaira Nebuchadnezzar	3–0	Fatima Khan	11–4, 11–5, 11–7
Komang Sudarnita	3–0	Kalsoom Khan	11–7, 11–6, 11–7
Maharani Ni	3–0	Nosheen Aslam	11–4, 11–2, 11–1
Almaira Nebuchadnezzar		Kalsoom Khan	not played
Komang Sudarnita		Fatima Khan	not played

21 September	Pakistan	0–3	India

Aleena Khan	0–3	Sutirtha Mukherjee	3–11, 3–11, 4–11
Kalsoom Khan	0–3	Syndrela Das	6–11, 7–11, 5–11
Fatima Khan	0–3	Sreeja Akula	4–11, 4–11, 5–11
Aleena Khan		Syndrela Das	not played
Kalsoom Khan		Sutirtha Mukherjee	not played

21 September	Indonesia	0–3	Singapore

Almaira Nebuchadnezzar	0–3	Zhao Tan	3–11, 9–11, 4–11
Cindy Putri	1–3	Ser Lin Qian	9–11, 9–11, 12–10, 7–11
Maharani Ni	0–3	Loy Ming Ying	6–11, 8–11, 6–11
Almaira Nebuchadnezzar		Ser Lin Qian	not played
Cindy Putri		Zhao Tan	not played

=== Knockout round ===
Round of 16
11	Uzbekistan	3
10	Kazakhstan	2
7	India	3
9	Thailand	2
6	Singapore	3
5	Hong Kong	2
12	Macau	1
4	Chinese Taipei	3

Quarterfinals
1	China	3
11	Uzbekistan	0
7	India	0
8	North Korea	3
3	South Korea	3
6	Singapore	0
4	Chinese Taipei	0
2	Japan	3

Semifinals
1	China	3
8	North Korea	0
3	South Korea	0
2	Japan	3

Final
1	China	3
2	Japan	0

==== Round of 16 ====
22 September	Uzbekistan	3–2	Kazakhstan

Asel Erkebaeva	1–3	Sarvinoz Mirkadirova	12–10, 3–11, 9–11, 14–16
Adelina Khasanova	1–3	Zauresh Akasheva	11–5, 3–11, 5–11, 8–11
Arujan Kamalova	3–2	Albina Zhaxylykova	11–9, 11–7, 7–11, 8–11, 11–2
Asel Erkebaeva	3–1	Zauresh Akasheva	11–8, 9–11, 11–9, 15–13
Adelina Khasanova	3–2	Sarvinoz Mirkadirova	8–11, 11–9, 11–9, 7–11, 11–7

22 September	Thailand	2–3	India

Orawan Paranang	3–2	Sreeja Akula	7–11, 1–11, 11–9, 11–6, 12–10
Suthasini Sawettabut	2–3	Yashaswini Ghorpade	8–11, 11–5, 11–7, 9–11, 9–11
Jinnipa Sawettabut	3–2	Diya Chitale	11–7, 5–11, 7–11, 11–7, 13–11
Orawan Paranang	0–3	Yashaswini Ghorpade	5–11, 8–11, 9–11
Suthasini Sawettabut	1–3	Sreeja Akula	11–9, 6–11, 10–12, 8–11

22 September	Hong Kong	2–3	Singapore

Su Tsz Tung	3–2	Loy Ming Ying	6–11, 11–5, 7–11, 11–5, 11–6
Doo Hoi Kem	2–3	Tan Zhao Yun	11–9, 6–11, 5–11, 11–6, 5–11
Ng Wing Lam	3–2	Ser Lin Qian	7–11, 13–11, 11–7, 13–15, 11–7
Su Tsz Tung	0–3	Tan Zhao Yun	8–11, 8–11, 5–11
Doo Hoi Kem	1–3	Loy Ming Ying	2–11, 15–13, 5–11, 9–11

22 September	Macau	1–3	Chinese Taipei

Leong On-na	2–3	Yeh Yi-tian	5–11, 3–11, 11–6, 11–8, 1–11
Kuan Cheok	0–3	Cheng I-ching	5–11, 6–11, 3–11
Zhu Yuling	3–0	Peng Yu-han	11–6, 11–4, 11–8
Leong On-na	0–3	Cheng I-ching	4–11, 2–11, 4–11
Kuan Cheok		Yeh Yi-tian	not played

==== Quarterfinals ====
22 September	Uzbekistan	0–3	China

Asel Erkebaeva	1–3	Sun Yingsha	5–11, 11–6, 6–11, 7–11
Arujan Kamalova	0–3	Wang Manyu	6–11, 3–11, 3–11
Adelina Khasanova	0–3	Kuai Man	3–11, 9–11, 1–11
Asel Erkebaeva		Wang Manyu	not played
Arujan Kamalova		Sun Yingsha	not played

22 September	North Korea	3–0	India

Kim Kum Yong	3–0	Sreeja Akula	11–7, 11–6, 11–5
Pyon Song Gyong	3–0	Yashaswini Ghorpade	11–4, 11–3, 11–6
Cha Su Yong	3–0	Diya Chitale	11–9, 11–7, 11–8
Kim Kum Yong		Yashaswini Ghorpade	not played
Pyon Song Gyong		Sreeja Akula	not played

22 September	South Korea	3–0	Singapore

Shin Yu-bin	3–1	Ser Lin Qian	11–4, 11–6, 5–11, 11–5
Joo Cheon-hui	3–2	Loy Ming Ying	11–9, 8–11, 11–5, 3–11, 11–9
Kim Na-yeong	3–0	Tan Zhao Yun	11–8, 11–5, 11–5
Shin Yu-bin		Loy Ming Ying	not played
Joo Cheon-hui		Ser Lin Qian	not played

22 September	Japan	3–0	Chinese Taipei

Miwa Harimoto	3–0	Yeh Yi-tian	11–6, 11–9, 11–6
Hina Hayata	3–1	Cheng I-ching	11–13, 11–7, 12–10, 11–2
Mima Ito	3–0	Peng Yu-han	11–7, 11–4, 11–3
Miwa Harimoto		Cheng I-ching	not played
Hina Hayata		Yeh Yi-tian	not played

==== Semifinals ====
23 September	North Korea	0–3	China

Pyon Song Gyong	0–3	Sun Yingsha	5–11, 5–11, 7–11
Kim Kum Yong	0–3	Wang Manyu	8–11, 4–11, 8–11
Cha Su Yong	0–3	Kuai Man	5–11, 5–11, 5–11
Pyon Song Gyong		Wang Manyu	not played
Kim Kum Yong		Sun Yingsha	not played

23 September	South Korea	0–3	Japan

Shin Yu-bin	0–3	Hina Hayata	6–11, 7–11, 4–11
Joo Cheon-hui	0–3	Miwa Harimoto	7–11, 8–11, 9–11
Kim Na-yeong	0–3	Miyu Nagasaki	8–11, 9–11, 7–11
Shin Yu-bin		Miwa Harimoto	not played
Joo Cheon-hui		Hina Hayata	not played

==== Final ====
24 September	China	3–0	Japan

Sun Yingsha	3–1	Hina Hayata	11–4, 11–6, 8–11, 11–7
Wang Manyu	3–2	Miwa Harimoto	6–11, 11–4, 9–11, 11–6, 12–10
Kuai Man	3–0	Mima Ito	11–6, 11–5, 11–7
Sun Yingsha		Miwa Harimoto	not played
Wang Manyu		Hina Hayata	not played
