= 2026 Asian Table Tennis Championships – Women's team =

Women's team at the 2026 Asian Table Tennis Championships
- Venue: Olimpiya shaharchasi
- Date: 19–25 October 2026
- Nations: 23

The women's team event in table tennis at the 2026 Asian Table Tennis Championships will be held at Olimpiya shaharchasi in Tashkent, Uzbekistan, from 19 to 25 October 2026.

== Format ==
All matches in the team events will be played as a best-of-five series of individual matches, with the following order of play:

Match 1	Match 2	Match 3	Match 4	Match 5
A vs X	B vs Y	C vs Z	A vs Y	B vs X

The team event is divided into two divisions:

=== First Division ===
- All teams, excluding the top six finishers from the 2025 edition, will compete in the First Division.
- Teams are divided into multiple round-robin groups.
- The winners and runners-up of each group advance to the First Division knockout stage. (Note: Runners-up can now compete for Champions Division for this edition, but not for previous editions.)
- The winners of the two First Division semifinals progress to join the Champion Division. (Note: Remaining teams do not play in position ranking bracket for this edition.)

=== Champion Division ===
- It consists of:
  - The top six teams from the 2025 edition.
  - The two winners of the First Division semifinals in the 2026 edition.
- Play begins directly in the quarterfinals in an eight-team knockout bracket.
- Teams defeated in the quarterfinals will play in position brackets to determine their final positions.

== Match Summary ==
=== First Division Knockout Stage ===
Seventh seed Chinese Taipei and eighth seed India entered Champion Division. This is the first time Chinese Taipei entered Champions Division since 2021, and they win a bronze medal since 2019.

=== Champion Division ===
==== Finals ====
Defending champion China did not send their key players Sun Yingsha and Wang Manyu in this competition, but they entered Finals facing full team Japan.

China's debutant Chen Yi was playing the first and the fourth match, and record 3-0 loss over Japanese defender Honoka Hashimoto and current world number 3 Miwa Harimoto.

Wang Yidi beats Miwa Harimoto 3-2 in the second match which helps China equalize.

Kuai Man and Hina Hayata met in the third match and Kuai's victory extends China 2-1 lead overall.

Since Chen Yi lost in fourth match, the last deciding match is between Wang Yidi and Honoka Hashimoto. Wang Yidi was leading 10-6 in the first game but Hashimoto came back and wins six points in a row. Hashimoto ends up 3-1 win over Wang Yidi and help Japan win their gold medal since 2024.

== Seeding ==
The seeding is based on ITTF Women's Team Ranking on October 2026. (Note: Seedings based on ITTF Team Ranking are the new rule for this edition, but top 6 from last edition qualifying to Champions Division remains the same. Even though some teams in First Division ranked higher than others in Champions Division, they need to play First Division because of not reaching top 6 last year.)The top six teams from 2025 edition directly qualify for the Champion Division.

=== Teams playing in Champion Division ===
Seed	Team	Player 1	Player 2	Player 3	Player 4	Player 5
1	China	Kuai Man	Wang Yidi	Chen Yi	Shi Xunyao	Xu Yi
2	Japan	Harimoto Miwa	Hayata Hina	Odo Satsuki	Hashimoto Honoka	Nagasaki Miyu
3	(South Korea) Korea Republic	Lee Daeun	Lee Eunhye	Lee Zion	Park Gahyeon	Yoo Siwoo
4	Hong Kong, China	Doo Hoi Kem	Su Tsz Tung	Ng Wing Lam	Lee Hoi Man	Kong Tsz Lam
5	Singapore	Zeng Jian	Ser Lin Qian	Loy Ming Ying	Tan Zhao Yun	Lai Chloe
6	Thailand	Suthasini Sawettabut	Orawan Paranang	Jinnipa Sawettabut	Kulapassr Vijitviriyagul	Phatsaraphon Wonglakhon

=== Teams playing in First Division ===
The remaining 17 teams will compete in the First Division. Teams are seeded according to the October 2026 ITTF Women's Team Ranking.

Seed	Team	Player 1	Player 2	Player 3	Player 4	Player 5
7	Chinese Taipei (Q)	Chen Szu-Yu	Chien Tung-Chuan	Peng Yu-Han	Wu Ying Syuan	Yeh Yi-Tian
8	India (Q)	Syndrela Das	Yashaswini Ghorpade	Swastika Ghosh	—	—
9	Kazakhstan	Zauresh Akasheva	Zhanerke Koshkumbayeva	Angelina Romanovskaya	Albina Zhaxylykova	Sarvinoz Mirkadirova
10	Malaysia	Karen Lyne	Tee Ai Xin	Chang Li Sian	Li Ying Im	—
11	Uzbekistan	Maftuna Elmurodova	Asel Erkebaeva	Arujan Kamalova	Maftuna Gulimova	Adelina Khasanova
12	Sri Lanka	Tamadi Kavindya Alagiyawadu	Bimandee Bandara	Maneesha Shalindi Gusthighghawadu	Shamalsha Halawathage	—
13	Macau, China	Chong Iok Teng	Leong I Nam	Seak Hui Li	Huang Cheong Leng	—
14	Iran	Mahshid Ashtari	Setayesh Iloukhani	Elina Rahimi	Neda Shahsavari	Fatemeh Yariseraji
15	Mongolia	Bolor-Erdene Batmunkh	Tuvshinbayar Enkhjin	Ankhmaa Ser-Od	—	—
16	Indonesia	Almaira Nebuchadnezzar	Citra Rasmi	Komang Sudarnita	Siti Aminah	Alisya Maliqa
17	Bangladesh	Khoy Sai	Sadia Mou	Sonam Soma	—	—
18	Maldives	Aishath Nafiz	Mishka Ibrahim	Muizzu Malaak	—	—
19	Kyrgyzstan	Ramida Abdimit alipova	Nurkyz Aiazbekova	Saida Kudusova	Raiana Muratalieva	—
20	Philippines	Kheith Cruz	Rose Jean Fadol	Angelou Joyce Laude	Chrishien Santillan	Althea Gudes
21	Tajikistan	Nargis Azizova	Dinara Ismailova	Hangoma Saidbekova	Parichehra Sharipova	Manizha Samadova
22	Jordan	Rinad El-Hasani	Batool Khader	Zeina Sadaqa	—	—
23	Kuwait	Maryam Abdulraheem	Jana Abedali	Menwah Alshammari	—	—

== First Division ==
=== Group Stage ===
==== Group 1 ====
Pos	Team	Pld	W	L	Pts	Promotion	(Chinese Taipei) TPE (7)	(Mongolia) MGL (15)	(Bangladesh) BAN (17)
1	Chinese Taipei (7)	2	2	0	4	First Division Knockout Stage	—	3–0	3–0
2	Mongolia (15)	2	1	1	3	First Division Knockout Stage	0–3	—	3–1
3	Bangladesh (17)	2	0	2	2		0–3	1–3	—

Updated to match(es) played on completed. Source: ITTF

==== Group 2 ====
Pos	Team	Pld	W	L	Pts	Promotion	(India) IND (8)	(Indonesia) INA (16)	(Kyrgyzstan) KGZ (19)
1	India (8)	2	2	0	4	First Division Knockout Stage	—	3–0	3–0
2	Indonesia (16)	2	1	1	3	First Division Knockout Stage	0–3	—	3–0
3	Kyrgyzstan (19)	2	0	2	2		0–3	0–3	—

Updated to match(es) played on completed. Source: ITTF

==== Group 3 ====
Pos	Team	Pld	W	L	Pts	Promotion	(Iran) IRI (14)	(Kazakhstan) KAZ (9)	(Maldives) MDV (18)
1	Iran (14)	2	2	0	4	First Division Knockout Stage	—	3–2	3–0
2	Kazakhstan (9)	2	1	1	3	First Division Knockout Stage	2–3	—	3–0
3	Maldives (18)	2	0	2	2		0–3	0–3	—

Updated to match(es) played on completed. Source: ITTF

==== Group 4 ====
Pos	Team	Pld	W	L	Pts	Promotion	(Malaysia) MAS (10)	(Philippines) PHI (20)	(Sri Lanka) SRI (12)	(Kuwait) KUW (23)
1	Malaysia (10)	3	3	0	6	First Division Knockout Stage	—	3–1	3–0	3–0
2	Philippines (20)	3	2	1	5	First Division Knockout Stage	1–3	—	3–2	3–0
3	Sri Lanka (12)	3	1	2	4		0–3	2–3	—	3–0
4	Kuwait (23)	3	0	3	3		0–3	0–3	0–3	—

Updated to match(es) played on completed. Source: ITTF

==== Group 5 ====
Pos	Team	Pld	W	L	Pts	Promotion	(Uzbekistan) UZB (11)	(Macau) MAC (13)	(Tajikistan) TJK (21)	(Jordan) JOR (22)
1	Uzbekistan (11)	3	3	0	6	First Division Knockout Stage	—	3–0	3–0	3–0
2	Macau, China (13)	3	2	1	5	First Division Knockout Stage	0–3	—	3–2	3–0
3	Tajikistan (21)	3	1	2	4		0–3	2–3	—	3–1
4	Jordan (22)	3	0	3	3		0–3	0–3	1–3	—

Updated to match(es) played on completed. Source: ITTF

=== First Division Knockout Stage ===
==== Section 1 ====
Preliminary 1
(13)	Macau, China	0
(16)	Indonesia	3

Preliminary 2
(7)	Chinese Taipei	3
(20)	Philippines	1
(16)	Indonesia	0
(14)	Iran	3

Preliminary 3 (Winners advance to Champions Division)
(7)	Chinese Taipei (Q)	3
(14)	Iran	1

==== Section 2 ====
Preliminary 1
(15)	Mongolia	0
(9)	Kazakhstan	3

Preliminary 2
(10)	Malaysia	3
(9)	Kazakhstan	1
(11)	Uzbekistan	1
(8)	India	3

Preliminary 3 (Winners advance to Champions Division)
(10)	Malaysia	0
(8)	India (Q)	3

== Champion Division ==
Quarterfinals (lost teams in QF will be playing in 5-8th position bracket)
(1)	China	3
(6)	Thailand	0
(8)	India (Q)	0
(3)	(South Korea) Korea Republic	3
(4)	Hong Kong, China	1
(7)	Chinese Taipei (Q)	3
(5)	Singapore	0
(2)	Japan	3

Semifinals
(1)	China	3
(3)	(South Korea) Korea Republic (bronze)	0
(7)	Chinese Taipei (Q) (bronze)	0
(2)	Japan	3

Final
(1)	China (silver)	2
(2)	Japan (gold)	3

=== 5-8th position bracket ===
(Note: Thailand and Singapore Women's Team win the 5-8th position match, which indicates they will be seeded in the next edition. Hong Kong, China and India will be in the First Division for the next edition.)

5th-8th semifinal
(6)	Thailand	3
(8)	India	1

5th-8th semifinal
(4)	Hong Kong, China	1
(5)	Singapore	3
