= Aye Lwin =

Aye Lwin may refer to:

- Aye Lwin (chess player)
- Aye Lwin (politician)
