= Table tennis at the 2021 SEA Games – Men's singles =

Table tennis – Men's singles at the 2021 SEA Games
- Venue: Hải Dương Gymnasium
- Dates: 18–20 May 2022
- Competitors: 13 from 7 nations

Medalists
gold medal	Nguyễn Đức Tuân (VIE)
silver medal	Phakpoom Sanguansin (THA)
bronze medal	Clarence Chew Zhe Yu (SIN)
bronze medal	Nguyễn Anh Tú (VIE)

The men's singles competition of the table tennis events at the 2021 SEA Games was held from 18 to 20 May at the Hải Dương Gymnasium, Hải Dương, Vietnam.

== Schedule ==
All times are Vietnam Time (UTC+07:00).

Date	Time	Round
18 May 2022	19:30	Preliminaries
19 May 2022	10:30	Preliminaries
20 May 2022	14:30	Semifinals
20 May 2022	20:30	Finals

== Results ==
=== Preliminary round ===
Source: Results (Groups) - Men's Singles

==== Group 1 ====
Player	Pld	W	L	GF	GA	PF	PA	Points
Phakpoom Sanguansin (THA)	2	2	0	6	1	83	54	4
Koen Pang Yew En (SIN)	2	1	1	4	3	76	61	3
Seng Arthid Vongdalasinh (LAO)	2	0	2	0	6	21	66	2

18 May 19:30
Name	1	2	3	4	5	Match
Phakpoom Sanguansin (THA)	11	11	11			3
Seng Arthid Vongdalasinh (LAO)	4	4	3			0
Report

19 May 10:30
Name	1	2	3	4	5	Match
Koen Pang Yew En (SIN)	11	11	11			3
Seng Arthid Vongdalasinh (LAO)	4	3	3			0
Report

19 May 15:00
Name	1	2	3	4	5	Match
Koen Pang Yew En (SIN)	5	11	15	12		1
Phakpoom Sanguansin (THA)	11	8	17	14		3
Report

==== Group 2 ====
Player	Pld	W	L	GF	GA	PF	PA	Points
Clarence Chew Zhe Yu (SIN)	2	2	0	6	2	82	64	4
Leong Chee Feng (MAS)	2	1	1	5	3	83	56	3
Bun Visal (CAM)	2	0	2	0	6	21	66	2

18 May 19:30
Name	1	2	3	4	5	Match
Leong Chee Feng (MAS)	11	11	11			3
Bun Visa (CAM)	2	3	2			0
Report

19 May 10:00
Name	1	2	3	4	5	Match
Clarence Chew Zhe Yu (SIN)	11	11	11			3
Bun Visa (CAM)	6	5	3			0
Report

19 May 15:00
Name	1	2	3	4	5	Match
Clarence Chew Zhe Yu (SIN)	5	11	12	8	13	3
Leong Chee Feng (MAS)	11	7	10	11	11	2
Report

==== Group 3 ====
Player	Pld	W	L	GF	GA	PF	PA	Points
Nguyễn Anh Tú (VIE)	2	2	0	6	4	88	85	4
Padasak Tanviriyavechakul (THA)	2	1	1	5	2	79	60	3
Jann Mari Nayre (PHI)	2	0	2	2	6	56	78	2

18 May 19:30
Name	1	2	3	4	5	Match
Jann Mari Nayre (PHI)	9	11	11	3	5	2
Nguyễn Anh Tú (VIE)	11	5	7	11	11	3
Report

19 May 10:00
Name	1	2	3	4	5	Match
Padasak Tanviriyavechakul (THA)	9	11	7	11	8	2
Nguyễn Anh Tú (VIE)	11	6	11	4	11	3
Report

19 May 15:00
Name	1	2	3	4	5	Match
Padasak Tanviriyavechakul (THA)	11	11	11			3
Jann Mari Nayre (PHI)	4	8	5			0
Report

==== Group 4 ====
Player	Pld	W	L	GF	GA	PF	PA	Points
Nguyễn Đức Tuân (VIE)	3	3	0	9	2	108	68	5
Wong Qi Shen (MAS)	3	2	1	8	3	103	77	4
Richard Gonzales (PHI)	3	1	2	3	7	77	107	3
Soeung Tola (CAM)	3	0	3	1	9	78	113	2

18 May 20:00
Name	1	2	3	4	5	Match
Richard Gonzales (PHI)	14	8	13	11		3
Soeung Tola (CAM)	12	11	11	7		1
Report

18 May 20:00
Name	1	2	3	4	5	Match
Wong Qi Shen (MAS)	11	4	11	9	1	2
Nguyễn Đức Tuân (VIE)	8	11	4	11	11	3
Report

19 May 10:30
Name	1	2	3	4	5	Match
Richard Gonzales (PHI)	3	8	6			0
Nguyễn Đức Tuân (VIE)	11	11	11			3
Report

19 May 10:30
Name	1	2	3	4	5	Match
Soeung Tola (CAM)	5	10	7			0
Wong Qi Shen (MAS)	11	12	11			3
Report

19 May 19:30
Name	1	2	3	4	5	Match
Richard Gonzales (PHI)	7	7	0			0
Wong Qi Shen (MAS)	11	11	11			3
Report

19 May 19:30
Name	1	2	3	4	5	Match
Nguyễn Đức Tuân (VIE)	11	11	11			3
Soeung Tola (CAM)	4	2	9			0
Report

=== Knockout round ===
Semifinals; 20 May 14:30
Phakpoom Sanguansin (THA)	4
Nguyễn Anh Tú (VIE)	2
Nguyễn Đức Tuân (VIE)	4
Clarence Chew Zhe Yu (SIN)	1

Gold medal match 20 May 20:30
Phakpoom Sanguansin (THA)	1
Nguyễn Đức Tuân (VIE)	4

==== Semifinals ====
20 May 14:30
Name	1	2	3	4	5	6	7	Match
Phakpoom Sanguansin (THA)	11	9	11	11	4	12		4
Nguyễn Anh Tú (VIE)	4	11	7	5	11	10		2
Report

20 May 15:30
Name	1	2	3	4	5	6	7	Match
Nguyễn Đức Tuân (VIE)	11	11	10	11	11			4
Clarence Chew Zhe Yu (SIN)	9	7	12	4	8			1
Report

==== Gold Medal Match ====
20 May 20:30
Name	1	2	3	4	5	6	7	Match
Phakpoom Sanguansin (THA)	7	9	11	7	11			1
Nguyễn Đức Tuân (VIE)	11	11	8	11	13			4
Report
