= Table tennis at the 2021 SEA Games – Mixed doubles =

Table tennis – Mixed doubles at the 2021 SEA Games
- Venue: Hải Dương Gymnasium
- Dates: 14–18 May 2022
- Competitors: 26 from 7 nations

Medalists
gold medal	Koen Pang Yew En; Wong Xin Ru	Singapore
silver medal	Clarence Chew Zhe Yu; Zeng Jian	Singapore
bronze medal	Padasak Tanviriyavechakul; Suthasini Sawettabut	Thailand
bronze medal	Phakpoom Sanguansin; Orawan Paranang	Thailand

The mixed doubles competition of the table tennis event at the 2021 SEA Games was held from 14 to 18 May at the Hải Dương Gymnasium in Hải Dương, Vietnam.

== Participating nations ==
A total of 26 athletes from seven nations competed in mixed doubles table tennis at the 2021 Southeast Asian Games:

- Cambodia (4)
- Laos (2)
- Malaysia (4)
- Philippines (4)
- Singapore (4)
- Thailand (4)
- Vietnam (4)

== Schedule ==
All times are Vietnam Time (UTC+07:00).

Date	Time	Round
Saturday, 14 May 2022	21:00	Round of 16
Sunday, 15 May 2022	10:00	Round of 16
Tuesday, 17 May 2022	10:00	Quarterfinals
Wednesday, 18 May 2022	10:00	Semifinals
Wednesday, 18 May 2022	14:30	Final

== Results ==
Source: Event Summary

Round of 16; 14 May 21:00 / 15 May 10:00
(Thailand) P Tanviriyavechakul (Thailand) S Sawettabut
Bye
(Vietnam) Đinh AH (Vietnam) Nguyễn KDK	3
(Laos) SA Vongdalasinh (Laos) T Southammavong	0
(Malaysia) Wong QS (Malaysia) Tee AX	13	11	5	11	3
(Philippines) J Adasa (Philippines) KR Cruz	11	7	11	7	1
(Cambodia) Bun V (Cambodia) Khiev C	1	2	2	0
(Singapore) Pang YEK (Singapore) Wong XR	11	11	11	3
(Thailand) P Sanguansin (Thailand) O Paranang
Bye
(Vietnam) Nguyễn ĐT (Vietnam) Bùi NL	11	11	11	3
(Cambodia) Kang Y (Cambodia) Bo I	4	5	4	0
(Malaysia) J Choong (Malaysia) Karen LAD	9	11	11	8	11	3
(Philippines) JM Nayre (Philippines) AJ Laude	11	4	4	11	7	2
Bye
(Singapore) Chew ZYC (Singapore) Zeng J

Quarterfinal; 17 May 10:00
(Thailand) P Tanviriyavechakul (Thailand) S Sawettabut	11	11	11	3
(Vietnam) Đinh AH (Vietnam) Nguyễn KDK	6	9	7	0
(Malaysia) Wong QS (Malaysia) Tee AX	11	10	11	9	5	2
(Singapore) Pang YEK (Singapore) Wong XR	3	12	6	11	11	3
(Thailand) P Sanguansin (Thailand) O Paranang	11	11	6	11	3
(Vietnam) Nguyễn ĐT (Vietnam) Bùi NL	6	6	11	5	1
(Malaysia) J Choong (Malaysia) Karen LAD	11	8	9	7	1
(Singapore) Chew ZYC (Singapore) Zeng J	6	11	11	11	3

Semifinal; 18 May 10:00
(Thailand) P Tanviriyavechakul (Thailand) S Sawettabut	9	8	11	0
(Singapore) Pang YEK (Singapore) Wong XR	11	11	13	3
(Thailand) P Sanguansin (Thailand) O Paranang	7	4	11	16	6	2
(Singapore) Chew ZYC (Singapore) Zeng J	11	11	6	14	11	3

Final; 18 May 14:30
(Singapore) Pang YEK (Singapore) Wong XR	11	11	7	7	11	3
(Singapore) Chew ZYC (Singapore) Zeng J	5	8	11	11	5	2
