= Table tennis at the 2021 SEA Games – Women's singles =

Table tennis – Women's singles at the 2021 SEA Games
- Venue: Hải Dương Gymnasium
- Dates: 18–20 May 2022
- Competitors: 14 from 7 nations

Medalists
gold medal	Orawan Paranang (THA)
silver medal	Suthasini Sawettabut (THA)
bronze medal	Ho Ying (MAS)
bronze medal	Zeng Jian (SGP)

The women's singles competition of the table tennis events at the 2021 SEA Games was held from 18 to 20 May at the Hải Dương Gymnasium, Hải Dương, Vietnam.

== Schedule ==
All times are Vietnam Time (UTC+07:00).

Date	Time	Round
18 May 2022	20:00	Preliminaries
19 May 2022	10:30	Preliminaries
20 May 2022	10:00	Semifinals
20 May 2022	19:30	Finals

== Results ==
=== Preliminary round ===
Source: Results (Groups) - Women's Singles

==== Group 1 ====
Player	Pld	W	L	GF	GA	PF	PA	Points
Suthasini Sawettabut (THA)	2	2	0	6	0	66	34	4
Angelou Joyce Laude (PHI)	2	1	1	3	5	64	75	3
Trần Mai Ngọc (VIE)	2	0	2	2	5	59	80	2

18 May 20:00
Name	1	2	3	4	5	Match
Trần Mai Ngọc (VIE)	6	11	11	8	6	2
Angelou Joyce Laude (PHI)	11	9	5	11	11	3
Report

19 May 10:30
Name	1	2	3	4	5	Match
Suthasini Sawettabut (THA)	11	11	11			3
Angelou Joyce Laude (PHI)	5	5	7			0
Report

19 May 19:30
Name	1	2	3	4	5	Match
Suthasini Sawettabut (THA)	11	11	11			3
Trần Mai Ngọc (VIE)	3	8	6			0
Report

==== Group 2 ====
Player	Pld	W	L	GF	GA	PF	PA	Points
Zeng Jian (SIN)	2	2	0	6	1	75	31	4
Alice Chang Li Sian (MAS)	2	1	1	4	3	55	56	3
Thiphakone Southammavong (LAO)	2	0	2	0	6	23	66	2

18 May 21:00
Name	1	2	3	4	5	Match
Alice Chang Li Sian (MAS)	11	11	11			3
Thiphakone Southammavong (LAO)	4	2	8			0
Report

19 May 10:30
Name	1	2	3	4	5	Match
Zeng Jian (SIN)	11	11	11			3
Thiphakone Southammavong (LAO)	2	4	3			0
Report

19 May 19:30
Name	1	2	3	4	5	Match
Zeng Jian (SIN)	11	11	9	11		3
Alice Chang Li Sian (MAS)	1	6	11	4		1
Report

==== Group 3 ====
Player	Pld	W	L	GF	GA	PF	PA	Points
Orawan Paranang (THA)	3	3	0	9	1	108	61	5
Kheith Rhynne Cruz (PHI)	3	2	1	7	3	96	70	4
Nguyễn Thị Nga (VIE)	3	1	2	3	6	86	78	3
Bo Insou (CAM)	3	0	3	0	9	21	99	2

18 May 20:30
Name	1	2	3	4	5	Match
Orawan Paranang (THA)	11	11	11			3
Bo Insou (CAM)	1	2	2			0
Report

18 May 21:00
Name	1	2	3	4	5	Match
Nguyễn Thị Nga (VIE)	6	8	11			0
Kheith Rhynne Cruz (PHI)	11	11	13			3
Report

19 May 14:30
Name	1	2	3	4	5	Match
Orawan Paranang (THA)	11	12	5	11		3
Kheith Rhynne Cruz (PHI)	3	10	11	4		1
Report

19 May 14:30
Name	1	2	3	4	5	Match
Bo Insou (CAM)	3	1	2			0
Nguyễn Thị Nga (VIE)	11	11	11			3
Report

19 May 20:00
Name	1	2	3	4	5	Match
Kheith Rhynne Cruz (PHI)	11	11	11			3
Bo Insou (CAM)	4	3	3			0
Report

19 May 20:00
Name	1	2	3	4	5	Match
Orawan Paranang (THA)	11	15	11			3
Nguyễn Thị Nga (VIE)	6	13	9			0
Report

==== Group 4 ====
Player	Pld	W	L	GF	GA	PF	PA	Points
Ho Ying (MAS)	3	3	0	9	1	108	52	5
Zhou Jingyi (SIN)	3	2	1	7	3	97	58	4
Nitnapha Kongphet (LAO)	3	1	2	3	6	55	82	3
Yin Chanrotana (CAM)	3	0	3	0	9	31	99	2

18 May 20:30
Name	1	2	3	4	5	Match
Ho Ying (MAS)	11	11	11			3
Yin Chanrotana (CAM)	8	2	1			0
Report

18 May 21:00
Name	1	2	3	4	5	Match
Zhou Jingyi (SIN)	11	11	11			3
Nitnapha Kongphet (LAO)	4	7	1			0
Report

19 May 14:30
Name	1	2	3	4	5	Match
Zhou Jingyi (SIN)	11	11	11			3
Yin Chanrotana (CAM)	1	2	1			0
Report

19 May 14:30
Name	1	2	3	4	5	Match
Nitnapha Kongphet (LAO)	1	3	6			0
Ho Ying (MAS)	11	11	11			3
Report

19 May 20:00
Name	1	2	3	4	5	Match
Yin Chanrotana (CAM)	8	6	2			0
Nitnapha Kongphet (LAO)	11	11	11			3
Report

19 May 20:00
Name	1	2	3	4	5	Match
Zhou Jingyi (SIN)	8	7	11	5		1
Ho Ying (MAS)	11	11	9	11		3
Report

=== Knockout round ===
Semifinals; 20 May 10:00
Suthasini Sawettabut (THA)	4
Ho Ying (MAS)	0
Orawan Paranang (THA)	4
Zeng Jian (SIN)	3

Gold medal match 20 May 19:30
Suthasini Sawettabut (THA)	2
Orawan Paranang (THA)	4

==== Semifinals ====
20 May 10:00
Name	1	2	3	4	5	6	7	Match
Suthasini Sawettabut (THA)	11	11	11	11				4
Ho Ying (MAS)	9	3	4	9				0
Report

20 May 11:00
Name	1	2	3	4	5	6	7	Match
Orawan Paranang (THA)	11	11	6	11	9	11	11	4
Zeng Jian (SIN)	8	13	11	8	11	2	7	3
Report

==== Gold Medal Match ====
20 May 19:30
Name	1	2	3	4	5	6	7	Match
Suthasini Sawettabut (THA)	11	9	3	11	10	7		2
Orawan Paranang (THA)	6	11	11	3	12	11		4
Report
