= Zaw Win Lay =

Burmese chess grandmaster (1963–2014)

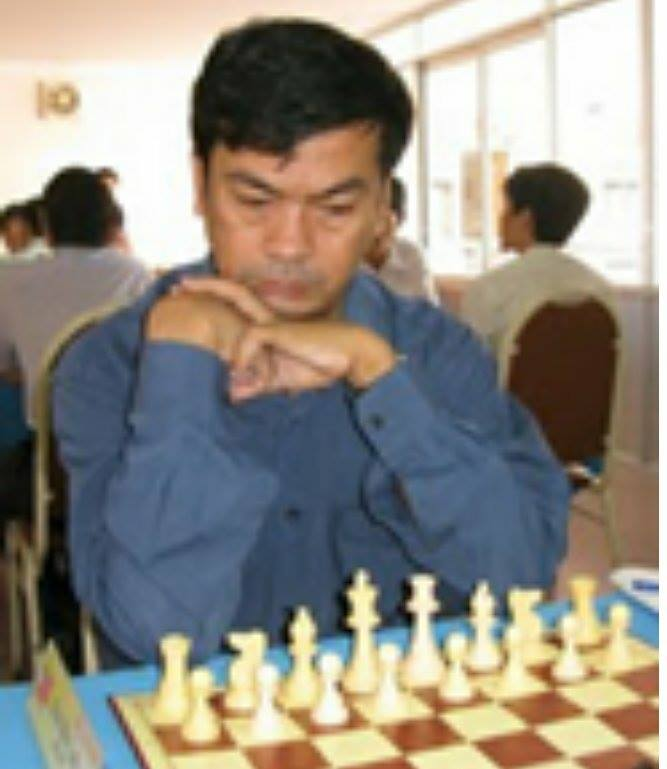

Personal information
- Born: 22 October 1963 Pakkoku, Myanmar
- Died: 3 October 2014 (aged 50) Mandalay, Myanmar

Chess career
- Country: Myanmar
- Title: Grandmaster (2000)
- Peak rating: 2633 (January 2000)
- Peak ranking: No. 43 (January 2000)

Zaw Win Lay (Burmese: ဇော်ဝင်းလေး; 22 October 1963 – 3 October 2014) was the first Burmese chess grandmaster.

== Biography ==
He was also a four-time Myanmar National Chess Championship winner in 1990, 1995–1996 and 2007. One of his most notable matches was a draw against the former World champion Anatoly Karpov in 2000.

Karpov vs. Zaw Win Lay, Bali 2000

Position: b1 black queen, d2 white knight, a2 black king, h6 white pawn, e6 black knight, h7 white king

Final position

== Death and legacy ==
Zaw Win Lay died on 3 October 2014, leaving behind a wife and two daughters. In his memory, the Myanmar Chess Federation has held the GM Zaw Win Lay Memorial International Chess Tournament in Myanmar annually since 2014.
