= Singapore at the 2021 SEA Games =

Singapore at the 2021 Southeast Asian Games
- IOC code: SGP
- NOC: Singapore National Olympic Council
- Website: www.singaporeolympics.com

in Hanoi, Vietnam
- Competitors: 424 in 33 sports
- Flag bearer: Sheik Farhan (Pencak Silat)
- Medals Ranked 5th: Gold 47 Silver 46 Bronze 71 Total 164

Southeast Asian Games appearances (overview)
- 1959; 1961; 1965; 1967; 1969; 1971; 1973; 1975; 1977; 1979; 1981; 1983; 1985; 1987; 1989; 1991; 1993; 1995; 1997; 1999; 2001; 2003; 2005; 2007; 2009; 2011; 2013; 2015; 2017; 2019; 2021; 2023; 2025; 2027; 2029

Singapore participated at the 2021 Southeast Asian Games held in Hanoi, Vietnam from 12 to 23 May 2022. The Games were postponed in 2021 due to the COVID-19 pandemic.

At the end of the Games, Singapore top the Medal Tally for Bowling, Fencing and Swimming. There were also 5 Games Records, 16 National Records and 41 Personal Best. 62 of the 164 medals were won by debutants.

During the closing ceremony, swimmer Quah Jing Wen was named as one of the MVP of the Games with 6 Gold and 1 Bronze medals.

== Competitors ==
Singapore sent a total of 424 athletes competing in 33 of 40 sports with 243 of them making their Games debut. No athletes were fielded in Bodybuilding, Futsal, Kurash, Petanque, Sepak Takraw, Vovinam and Weightlifting.

== Medal summary ==
=== Medal by sport ===
Medals by sport
| Sport | 1st place, gold medalist(s) | 2nd place, silver medalist(s) | 3rd place, bronze medalist(s) | Total |
|---|---|---|---|---|
| Archery | 1 | 0 | 1 | 2 |
| Athletics | 1 | 3 | 7 | 11 |
| Badminton | 0 | 1 | 5 | 6 |
| Basketball | 0 | 0 | 0 | 0 |
| Beach volleyball | 0 | 0 | 0 | 0 |
| Billiards | 1 | 2 | 4 | 7 |
| Bowling | 3 | 1 | 3 | 7 |
| Boxing | 0 | 0 | 1 | 1 |
| Canoeing | 2 | 0 | 1 | 3 |
| Chess | 0 | 2 | 3 | 5 |
| Cycling | 0 | 1 | 1 | 2 |
| Dancesport | 0 | 0 | 0 | 0 |
| Diving | 0 | 3 | 1 | 4 |
| Esports | 0 | 1 | 3 | 4 |
| Fencing | 6 | 4 | 5 | 15 |
| Finswimming | 0 | 0 | 0 | 0 |
| Football | 0 | 0 | 0 | 0 |
| Golf | 0 | 1 | 0 | 1 |
| Gymnastics | 0 | 1 | 3 | 4 |
| Handball | 0 | 0 | 0 | 0 |
| Judo | 0 | 0 | 1 | 1 |
| Ju-jitsu | 1 | 1 | 1 | 3 |
| Karate | 0 | 0 | 0 | 0 |
| Kickboxing | 0 | 0 | 0 | 0 |
| Muaythai | 0 | 0 | 1 | 1 |
| Pencak silat | 4 | 3 | 4 | 11 |
| Rowing | 0 | 0 | 0 | 0 |
| Shooting | 2 | 3 | 3 | 8 |
| Swimming | 21 | 11 | 12 | 44 |
| Table tennis | 2 | 3 | 4 | 9 |
| Taekwondo | 0 | 0 | 3 | 3 |
| Tennis | 0 | 0 | 0 | 0 |
| Triathlon | 0 | 0 | 0 | 0 |
| Wrestling | 0 | 1 | 1 | 2 |
| Wushu | 2 | 3 | 1 | 6 |
| Xiangqi | 1 | 1 | 2 | 4 |
| Total | 47 | 46 | 71 | 164 |

=== Medal by date ===
Medals by date
| Day | Date | 1st place, gold medalist(s) | 2nd place, silver medalist(s) | 3rd place, bronze medalist(s) | Total |
|---|---|---|---|---|---|
| -4 | 8 May | 0 | 0 | 0 | 0 |
| -3 | 9 May | 0 | 1 | 0 | 1 |
| -2 | 10 May | 0 | 1 | 1 | 2 |
| -1 | 11 May | 1 | 2 | 2 | 5 |
| 0 | 12 May | 0 | 0 | 0 | 0 |
| 1 | 13 May | 1 | 2 | 3 | 6 |
| 2 | 14 May | 7 | 4 | 7 | 18 |
| 3 | 15 May | 6 | 11 | 9 | 26 |
| 4 | 16 May | 9 | 4 | 8 | 21 |
| 5 | 17 May | 6 | 7 | 10 | 23 |
| 6 | 18 May | 7 | 8 | 9 | 24 |
| 7 | 19 May | 7 | 3 | 7 | 17 |
| 8 | 20 May | 3 | 1 | 9 | 13 |
| 9 | 21 May | 0 | 0 | 5 | 5 |
| 10 | 22 May | 0 | 2 | 1 | 3 |
| 11 | 23 May | 0 | 0 | 0 | 0 |
| Total | | 47 | 46 | 71 | 164 |

== Medallists ==
| Medal | Name | Sport | Event | Date |
|---|---|---|---|---|
| Gold | Peter Edward Gilchrist; Alex Puan | Billiards | Men's English billiards doubles | 20 May |
| Gold | Alvin Woo Tsung Han | Xiangqi | Men's Standard Singles | 20 May |
| Gold | Amanda Mak Sao Keng; Teh Xiu Hong; Teo Shun Xie | Shooting | Women's 10m air pistol Team | 20 May |
| Gold | Gan Ching Hwee; Christie Chue; Quah Jing Wen; Quah Ting Wen | Swimming | Women's 4 × 100 m medley relay | 19 May |
| Gold | Quah Jing Wen | Swimming | Women's 100 m butterfly | 19 May |
| Gold | Teong Tzen Wei | Swimming | Men's 50 m freestyle | 19 May |
| Gold | Letitia Sim | Swimming | Women's 100 m breastroke | 19 May |
| Gold | Cherie Tan; New Hui Fen; Daphne Tan; Bernice Lim | Bowling | Women's team | 19 May |
| Gold | Loh Tze Chieh Contessa | Archery | Women's individual compound | 19 May |
| Gold | Lucas Teo; Brandon Ooi | Canoeing | Men's K2 1000m | 19 May |
| Gold | Bonnie Yeo; Letitia Sim; Quah Jing Wen; Quah Ting Wen | Swimming | Women's 4 × 100 m medley relay | 18 May |
| Gold | Gan Ching Hwee | Swimming | Women's 1500 m freestyle | 18 May |
| Gold | Clarence Chew; Ethan Poh | Table tennis | Men's doubles | 18 May |
| Gold | Koen Pang; Wong Xin Ru | Table tennis | Mixed doubles | 18 May |
| Gold | Jonathan Au Yeong; Kieren Lock; Matthew James Lim; Joel Chua | Fencing | Men's Foil Team | 18 May |
| Gold | Teh Xiu Hong | Shooting | Women's 25m Sport Pistol | 18 May |
| Gold | Lucas Teo | Canoeing | Men's K1 1000m | 18 May |
| Gold | Maximillian Ang | Swimming | Men's 200 m breaststroke | 17 May |
| Gold | Quah Zheng Wen | Swimming | Men's 50 m backstroke | 17 May |
| Gold | Cherie Tan; New Hui Fen | Bowling | Women's doubles | 17 May |
| Gold | Gan Ching Hwee | Swimming | Women's 400 m freestyle | 17 May |
| Gold | Simon Lee; Samson Lee; Sito Jian Tong; Elliot Han | Fencing | Men's Épée Team | 17 May |
| Gold | Maxine Wong; Cheung Kemei; Chloe Ng; Denyse Chan | Fencing | Women's Foil Team | 17 May |
| Gold | Quah Zheng Wen; Maximillian Ang; Joseph Schooling; Jonathan Tan | Swimming | Men's 4 × 100 m medley relay | 16 May |
| Gold | Letitia Sim | Swimming | Women's 50 m breaststroke | 16 May |
| Gold | Joseph Schooling | Swimming | Men's 100 m butterfly | 16 May |
| Gold | Gan Ching Hwee | Swimming | Women's 200 m freestyle | 16 May |
| Gold | Cherie Tan | Bowling | Women's singles | 16 May |
| Gold | Kiria Tikanah; Elle Koh; Victoria Lim; Rebecca Ong | Fencing | Women's Épée Team | 16 May |
| Gold | Sheik Farhan | Pencak silat | Men's tanding class J | 16 May |
| Gold | Muhammad Hazim | Pencak silat | Men's tanding class C | 16 May |
| Gold | Nurul Suhaila | Pencak silat | Women's tanding class E | 16 May |
| Gold | Amanda Lim; Christie Chue; Quah Ting Wen; Quah Jing Wen | Swimming | Women's 4 × 100 m freestyle relay | 15 May |
| Gold | Teong Tzen Wei | Swimming | Men's 50 m butterfly | 15 May |
| Gold | Gan Ching Hwee | Swimming | Women's 800 m freestyle | 15 May |
| Gold | Quah Zheng Wen | Swimming | Men's 100 m freestyle | 15 May |
| Gold | Noah Lim | Jujitsu | Men's under 69 kg | 15 May |
| Gold | Jonathan Au Yeong | Fencing | Men's Foil | 15 May |
| Gold | Quah Jing Wen | Swimming | Women's 200 m individual medley | 14 May |
| Gold | Quah Zheng Wen | Swimming | Men's 100 m backstroke | 14 May |
| Gold | Quah Ting Wen | Swimming | Women's 100 m freestyle | 14 May |
| Gold | Quah Jing Wen | Swimming | Women's 200m butterfly | 14 May |
| Gold | Shanti Pereira | Athletics | Women's 200M | 14 May |
| Gold | Kimberly Ong Li Ling | Wushu | Women's daoshu + Gunshu | 14 May |
| Gold | Chan Jun Kai | Wushu | Men's taijijian | 14 May |
| Gold | Elle Koh | Fencing | Women's Épée | 13 May |
| Gold | Iqbal Abdul Rahman | Pencak silat | Men's tunggal | 11 May |
| Silver | Loh Kean Yew | Badminton | Men's Singles | 22 May |
| Silver | Lin Swee Hon | Shooting | Men's 25m Standard Pistol | 22 May |
| Silver | Luo Yiwei | Cycling | Women's individual time trial | 20 May |
| Silver | Quah Ting Wen | Swimming | Women's 100 m butterfly | 19 May |
| Silver | Jonathan Tan | Swimming | Men's 50 m freestyle | 19 May |
| Silver | Gary Chow | Wrestling | Men's Freestyle 86 kg | 19 May |
| Silver | Women's Team | Esports | League of Legends Wild Rift (Mobile) Team | 18 May |
| Silver | Quah Zheng Wen | Swimming | Men's 200 m freestyle | 18 May |
| Silver | Amanda Lim | Swimming | Women's 50 m freestyle | 18 May |
| Silver | Shanti Pereira | Athletics | Women's 100m | 18 May |
| Silver | Zhou Jingyi; Zeng Jian | Table tennis | Women's doubles | 18 May |
| Silver | Clarence Chew; Zeng Jian | Table tennis | Mixed doubles | 18 May |
| Silver | Fernal Tan; Gai Tianrui | Shooting | Mixed 10m air rifle | 18 May |
| Silver | Jolie Lee; Lee Kar Moon; Nicole Wee; Jessica Ong | Fencing | Women's Sabre Team | 18 May |
| Silver | Quah Ting Wen | Swimming | Women's 50 m butterfly | 17 May |
| Silver | Jessica Tan Hui Min | Billiards | Women's 9-ball Pool Singles | 17 May |
| Silver | Tin Jingyao | Chess | Men's Rapid | 17 May |
| Silver | Gong Qianyun | Chess | Women's Rapid | 17 May |
| Silver | Wong Zen Joi, Lionel | Shooting | Men's 10m air rifle | 17 May |
| Silver | Timothy Tham; Muhd Jaris Goh | Bowling | Men's doubles | 17 May |
| Silver | Peter Edward Gilchrist | Billiards | Men's English Billiards | 17 May |
| Silver | Quah Zheng Wen | Swimming | Men's 100 m butterfly | 16 May |
| Silver | Ang Chen Xiang | Athletics | Men's 110m hurdles | 16 May |
| Silver | Sheik Ferdous | Pencak silat | Men's tanding class G | 16 May |
| Silver | Abdul Raazak | Pencak silat | Men's tanding class F | 16 May |
| Silver | Mikkel Lee | Swimming | Men's 50 m butterfly | 15 May |
| Silver | Tang Yong Siang | Jujitsu | Men's 56 kg | 15 May |
| Silver | Christie Chue | Swimming | Women's 200 m breaststroke | 15 May |
| Silver | Jonathan Tan | Swimming | Men's 100 m freestyle | 15 May |
| Silver | Zhou Jingyi; Zeng Jian; Wong Xin Ru; Goi Rui Xuan; Zhang Wanlin | Table tennis | Women's team | 15 May |
| Silver | Michelle Sng Suat Li | Athletics | Women's high jump | 15 May |
| Silver | Terry Tay Wei-an | Gymnastics | Men's floor Exercise | 15 May |
| Silver | Jessica Ong | Fencing | Women's Sabre | 15 May |
| Silver | Ngo Lan Huong; Low Yi Hao | Xiangqi | Blitz Team | 15 May |
| Silver | Aloysa Atienza | Golf | Women's individual | 15 May |
| Silver | Jowen Lim Si Wei | Wushu | Men's daoshu + Gunshu | 15 May |
| Silver | Letitia Sim | Swimming | Women's 200 m individual medley | 14 May |
| Silver | Maximillian Ang | Swimming | Men's 100 m breastroke | 14 May |
| Silver | Maxine Wong | Fencing | Fencing Women's Foil | 14 May |
| Silver | Zoe Tan Ziyi | Wushu | Women's daoshu + Gunshu | 14 May |
| Silver | Kiria Tikanah | Fencing | Women's Épée | 13 May |
| Silver | Jowen Lim Si Wei | Wushu | Men's Changquan | 13 May |
| Silver | Ong Rei En; Ong Sze En | Diving | Women's Synchronized 10m platform | 11 May |
| Silver | Muhammad Hazim; Muhammad Haziq | Pencak silat | Men's Ganda | 11 May |
| Silver | Jonathan Chan; Max Lee | Diving | Men's Synchronized 10m platform | 10 May |
| Silver | Avvir Tham | Diving | Men's 1 metre springboard | 9 May |
| Bronze | Team | Esports | Mixed League of Legends (PC) Team | 22 May |
| Bronze | Terry Hee; Loh Kean Hean | Badminton | Men's doubles | 21 May |
| Bronze | Cheryl Gwa Wei Ying | Muaythai | Women's 48kg | 21 May |
| Bronze | Jason Teh Jia Heng | Badminton | Men's singles | 21 May |
| Bronze | Nur Insyirah Khan; Bernice Lim | Badminton | Women's doubles | 21 May |
| Bronze | Brandon Ooi Wei Cheng; Daniel Koh Teck Wai; Pan Congchang; Jovi Jayden Kalaichelvan | Canoeing | Men's K-4 500 m | 21 May |
| Bronze | Muhammad Dinie Hakeem | Boxing | Men's 81-91 kg | 20 May |
| Bronze | Sharik Aslam Sayed | Billiards | Men's 10-ball Pool Singles | 20 May |
| Bronze | Clarence Chew | Table tennis | Men's singles | 20 May |
| Bronze | Aloysius Yapp | Billiards | Men's 10-ball Pool Singles | 20 May |
| Bronze | Gong Qianyun | Chess | Women's Blitz | 20 May |
| Bronze | Martina Lindsay Veloso | Shooting | Women's 50m rifle 3 positions | 20 May |
| Bronze | Tin Jingyao | Chess | Men's Blitz | 20 May |
| Bronze | Zeng Jian | Table tennis | Women's singles | 20 May |
| Bronze | Ngo Lan Huong | Xiangqi | Women's Standard Singles | 20 May |
| Bronze | Mixed Team | Esports | Mixed Mobile Legends: Bang Bang Team | 19 May |
| Bronze | Ong Jung Yi | Swimming | Men's 200 m butterfly | 19 May |
| Bronze | Christie Chue | Swimming | Women's 100 m breastroke | 19 May |
| Bronze | Siti Mastura | Shooting | Women's trap | 19 May |
| Bronze | Madeleine Ong Xue Li | Archery | Women's individual compound | 19 May |
| Bronze | Cheah Ray Han; Darren Ong; Muhd Jaris Goh; Timothy Tham | Bowling | Men's Team | 19 May |
| Bronze | Yeo Boon Kiak | Cycling | Men's Criterium | 19 May |
| Bronze | Maximillian Ang | Swimming | Men's 200 m medley | 18 May |
| Bronze | Reuben Rainer Lee; Calvin Quek; Tan Zong Yang; Thiruben Thana Rajan | Athletics | Men's 4x400M Relay | 18 May |
| Bronze | Lee Song Lim; Vincent Tang Hong Jin | Judo | Men's Kodokan Goshin Jutsu | 18 May |
| Bronze | Quah Ting Wen | Swimming | Women's 50 m freestyle | 18 May |
| Bronze | Maximillian Ang | Swimming | Men's 50 m breaststroke | 18 May |
| Bronze | Marc Brian Louis | Athletics | Men's 100m | 18 May |
| Bronze | Goh Chui Ling | Athletics | Women's 10000m | 18 May |
| Bronze | Nichelle Tan Ying Xuan | Taekwondo | Women's U53 kg Kyorugi | 18 May |
| Bronze | Koen Pang; Josh Chua | Table Tennis | Men's doubles | 18 May |
| Bronze | Loh Kean Yew; Loh Kean Hean; Terry Hee; Danny Bawa Chrisnanta; Andy Kwek; Jason Teh Jia Heng; Joel Koh; Kubo Junsuke; Lim Shun Tian; Wesley Koh | Badminton | Men's team | 17 May |
| Bronze | Quah Zheng Wen; Glen Lim; Joseph Schooling; Jonathan Tan | Swimming | Men's 4 × 200 m freestyle relay | 17 May |
| Bronze | Timothy Loh Yu | Wrestling | Men's Greco-Roman 130 kg | 17 May |
| Bronze | Isabel Felipa Rivas | Taekwondo | Women's U46 kg Kyorugi | 17 May |
| Bronze | Quah Jing Wen | Swimming | Women's 50 m butterfly | 17 May |
| Bronze | Calvin Quek | Athletics | Men's 400m hurdles | 17 May |
| Bronze | Darren Ong; Cheah Ray Han | Bowling | Men's doubles | 17 May |
| Bronze | Aloysius Yapp | Billiards | Men's 9-ball Pool Singles | 17 May |
| Bronze | Toh Lian Han | Billiards | Men's 9-ball Pool Singles | 17 May |
| Bronze | Yeo Jia Min; Jin Yujia; Crystal Wong; Nur Insyirah Khan; Grace Chua; Bernice Lim; Tan Wei Han; Megan Lee; Jaslyn Hooi | Badminton | Women's team | 17 May |
| Bronze | Dixon Ho; Brandon Low; Darren Yap | Taekwondo | Men's poomsae team | 16 May |
| Bronze | Marc Brian Lois; Joshua Chua; Mark Lee; Ian Koe | Athletics | Men's 4x100M Relay | 16 May |
| Bronze | Christie Chue | Swimming | Women's 50 m breaststroke | 16 May |
| Bronze | Chan Zi Yi | Swimming | Women's 200 m freestyle | 16 May |
| Bronze | Glen Lim | Swimming | Men's 400 m freestyle | 16 May |
| Bronze | New Hui Fen | Bowling | Women's singles | 16 May |
| Bronze | Choy Yu Yong; Chan Phu Xien; Jorelle See; Dan Wei Zuo | Fencing | Men's Sabre Team | 16 May |
| Bronze | Adele Tan; Fernal Tan; Natanya Tan | Shooting | Women's 10m air rifle Team | 16 May |
| Bronze | Tin Jingyao | Chess | Men's Standard Individual | 15 May |
| Bronze | Letitia Sim | Swimming | Women's 200 m breaststroke | 15 May |
| Bronze | Men's Team | Esports | League of Legends Wild Rift (Mobile) Team | 15 May |
| Bronze | Siti Khatijah | Pencak silat | Women's tanding class F | 15 May |
| Bronze | Ashley Lim Yi-Xuan | Swimming | Women's 800 m freestyle | 15 May |
| Bronze | Nadine Joy Nathan | Gymnastics | Women's uneven bars | 15 May |
| Bronze | Tan Zong Yang | Athletics | Men's 400M | 15 May |
| Bronze | Jolie Lee | Fencing | Women's Sabre | 15 May |
| Bronze | Syakir Jeffry | Pencak silat | Men's tanding class H | 15 May |
| Bronze | Nadine Joy Nathan; Aryanna Shetty; Kaitlyn Lim; Cheong Yuet Yung; Emma Yap En-lin; Shandy Poh | Gymnastics | Women's artistic team | 14 May |
| Bronze | Alvin Woo; Low Yi Hao | Xiangqi | Rapid Team | 14 May |
| Bronze | Clarence Chew; Koen Pang; Ethan Poh; Lucas Tan; Josh Chua | Table tennis | Men's team | 14 May |
| Bronze | Fiona Toh | Jujitsu | Women's 62 kg | 14 May |
| Bronze | Cheung Kemei | Fencing | Fencing Women's Foil | 14 May |
| Bronze | Simon Lee Renjie | Fencing | Fencing Men's Épée | 14 May |
| Bronze | Goh Chui Ling | Athletics | Women's 1500m | 14 May |
| Bronze | Mohammad Mikhail Haziq; Chong Jer Rong; Robin Sim; Zac Liew; Kaeson Lim; Terry Tay | Gymnastics | Men's artistic team | 13 May |
| Bronze | Chan Phu Xien | Fencing | Men's Sabre | 13 May |
| Bronze | Chan Jun Kai | Wushu | Men's Taiqiquan | 13 May |
| Bronze | Nur Azlyana; Sharifah Shazza | Pencak silat | Women's Ganda | 11 May |
| Bronze | Nur Ashikin; Amirah Sahrin; Iffah Batrisyia | Pencak silat | Women's regu | 11 May |
| Bronze | Fong Kay Yian | Diving | Women's 3m springboard | 10 May |
All sporting records and medalist are kept by SNOC at

== Results ==
=== Archery ===
Compound

| Athlete | Event | Qualification Round | | Round of 8 | | Quarterfinals | | Semi-finals | | Finals | Rank |
| Athlete | Event | Score | Seed | Score | Seed | Score | Seed | Score | Seed | Opposition Score | Rank |
|---|---|---|---|---|---|---|---|---|---|---|---|
| Goh Jun Hui | Men's individual | 672 | 21 | 137 | | Did not advance | | | | | |
| Lee Chung Hee Alan | Men's individual | 680 | 17 | 139 | | 134 | | did not advance | | | |
| Woon Teng Ng | Men's individual | 672 | 22 | Did not advance | | | | | | | |
| Goh Jun Hui; Lee Chung Hee Alan; Woon Teng Ng | Men's team | —N/a | | | | 225 | | Did not advance | | | |
| Chai Xin Yu Keller | Women's individual | 616 | 21 | Did not advance | | | | | | | |
| Loh Tze Chieh Contessa | Women's individual | 674 | 10 | 137 | | 141 | | 137 | | 144 | 3rd place, bronze medalist(s) |
| Madeleine Ong Xue Li | Women's individual | 664 | 18 | 137 | | 136 | | 132 | | 146 | 1st place, gold medalist(s) |
| Chai Xin Yu Keller; Loh Tze Chieh Contessa; Madeleine Ong Xue Li | Women's team | —N/a | | | | 216 | | Did not advance | | | |
| Chai Xin Yu Keller; Loh Tze Chieh Contessa; Madeleine Ong Xue Li; Goh Jun Hui; Lee Chung Hee Alan; Woon Teng Ng | Mixed Team | —N/a | | | | 152 | | Did not advance | | | |

=== Athletics ===
Men
Track and road events

| Athlete | Event | Heat | | Final | |
| Athlete | Event | Result | Rank | Result | Rank |
|---|---|---|---|---|---|
| Marc Brian Louis | Men's 100m | 10.48 | 1 Q | 10.56 | 3rd place, bronze medalist(s) |
| Joshua Hanwei Chua | Men's 100m | 10.94 | =10 | Did not advance | |
| Reuben Rainer Lee | Men's 200m | 21.16 | 7 Q | 21.070 NR | 5 |
| Mark Lee Ren | Men's 200m | 21.84 | 9 | —N/a | |
| Thiruben Thana Rajan | Men's 400m | 49.29 | 7 Q | 48.22 | 7 |
| Tan Zong Yang | Men's 400m | 48.53 | 5 Q | 47.46 | 3rd place, bronze medalist(s) |
| Ang Chen Xiang | Men's 110m hurdles | —N/a | | 13.94 | 2nd place, silver medalist(s) |
| Chong Wei Guan | Men's 110m hurdles | —N/a | | 14.95 | 8 |
| Calvin Quek | Men's 400m hurdles | 53.880 | 4 Q | 51.19 | 3rd place, bronze medalist(s) |
| Marc Brian Lois; Joshua Chua; Mark Lee; Ian Koe | Men's 4x100M Relay | —N/a | | 39.44 | 3rd place, bronze medalist(s) |
| Reuben Rainer Lee; Calvin Quek; Tan Zong Yang; Thiruben Thana Rajan | Men's 4x400M Relay | —N/a | | 3:11.09 | 2nd place, silver medalist(s) |
| Ethan Yikai Yan | Men's 1500M | —N/a | | 4:00.19 | 7 |
| Jeevaneesh S/O Soundararajah | Men's 1500M | —N/a | | 4:04.43 | 8 |
| Daniel Leow Soon Yee | Marathon | —N/a | | 3:02.02 | 10 |
| Wong Yaohan Melvin | Marathon | —N/a | | 2:45.41 | 8 |

Women
Track and road events

| Athlete | Event | Heat | | Final | |
| Athlete | Event | Result | Rank | Result | Rank |
|---|---|---|---|---|---|
| Pereira Veronica Shanti | Women's 100m | 11.98 | 4 Q | 11.62 | 2nd place, silver medalist(s) |
| Pereira Veronica Shanti | Women's 200m | 24.06 | 3 Q | 23.52 NR | 1st place, gold medalist(s) |
| Goh Chui Ling | Women's 800m | —N/a | | 2:11.79 | 4 |
| Nur Izlyn Binte Zaini | Women's 110m hurdles | —N/a | | 13.87 | 5 |
| Goh Chui Ling | Women's 1500M | —N/a | | 4:33.41 | 3rd place, bronze medalist(s) |
| Hu Xiuying | Women's 5000M | —N/a | | 18:24.45 | 6 |
| Goh Chui Ling | Women's 10000M | —N/a | | 39:22.26 | 3rd place, bronze medalist(s) |
| Hu Xiuying | Women's 10000M | —N/a | | 40:34.160 | 4 |
| Cheryl Emily Chan Xue Rou | Women's 3000M Steeplechase | —N/a | | 11:48.37 | 5 |
| Tan Fang Yu Sharon | Women's Marathon | —N/a | | 3:22.52 | 7 |
| Jasmine Goh Mei Ling | Women's Marathon | —N/a | | 3:10.33 | 5 |
| Sng Suat Li, Michelle | Women's High jump | —N/a | | 1.75m | 2nd place, silver medalist(s) |
| Phua Jasmin | Women's Discus throw | —N/a | | 44.42m | 5 |

Field events

| Athlete | Event | Heat | | Final | |
| Athlete | Event | Result | Rank | Result | Rank |
|---|---|---|---|---|---|
| Sng Suat Li, Michelle | Women's High jump | —N/a | | 1.75m | 2nd place, silver medalist(s) |
| Phua Jasmin | Women's Discus throw | —N/a | | 44.42m | 5 |

== Badminton ==
Men

| Athlete | Event | Round of 16 | Quarterfinal | Semifinal | Final | |
| Athlete | Event | Opposition Score | Opposition Score | Opposition Score | Opposition Score | Rank |
|---|---|---|---|---|---|---|
| Loh Kean Yew | Singles | Kok J H (MAS); W (18–21, 21–15, 21–11) | J A Albo (PHI); W (21–7, 21–8) | Nguyễn TM (VIE); W (21–15, 10–21, 23–21) | K Vitidsarn (THA); L (13–21, 13–21) | 2nd place, silver medalist(s) |
| Jason Teh | Singles | R L Pedrosa (PHI); W (21–16, 21–6) | C A D Wardoyo (INA); W (21–16, 21–16) | K Vitidsarn (THA); L (11–21, 12–21) | Did not advance | 3rd place, bronze medalist(s) |
| Terry Hee; Loh Kean Hean | Doubles | S Liza / P Risatsya (CAM); W (21–6, 21–13) | P Sukphun / P Teeraratsakul (THA); W (21–18, 21–13) | P Kusumawardana / (Indonesia) Y Rambitan (INA); L (21–15, 17–21, 19–21) | Did not advance | 3rd place, bronze medalist(s) |
| Danny Bawa Chrisnanta; Andy Kwek | Doubles | C Charoenkitamorn / N Yordphaisong (THA); L (14–21, 21–23) | Did not advance | | | |
| Andy Kwek; Danny Bawa Chrisnanta; Terry Hee; Joel Koh Jia Wei; Kubo Junsuke; Lim Shun Tian; Loh Kean Hean; Loh Kean Yew; Jason Teh; Wesley Koh Eng Keat | Team | —N/a | Laos (LAO); W 3–0 | Malaysia (MAS); L 2–3 | Did not advance | 3rd place, bronze medalist(s) |

Women

| Athlete | Event | Round of 16 | Quarterfinal | Semifinal | Final | |
| Athlete | Event | Opposition Score | Opposition Score | Opposition Score | Opposition Score | Rank |
|---|---|---|---|---|---|---|
| Jaslyn Hooi | Singles | S Nurshuhaini (MAS); L (19–21, 11–21) | Did not advance | | | |
| Yeo Jia Min | Singles | Bye | P Chaiwan (THA); L (12–21, 16–21) | Did not advance | | |
| Insyirah Khan; Bernice Lim Zhi Rui | Doubles | Go P K / Yap L (MAS) / W (21–15, 21–15) | E C Inlayo / S A Ramos (PHI); W (21–15, 21–19) | A Rahayu / S F S Ramadhanti (INA); W (21–10, 21–7) | Did not advance | 3rd place, bronze medalist(s) |
| Jin Yujia; Crystal Wong | Doubles | F V D Gani / R Sugiarto (INA); L (17–21, 18–21) | Did not advance | | | |
| Grace Chua Hui Zhen; Jaslyn Hooi; Jin Yujia; Bernice Lim Zhi Rui; Megan Lee Xinyi; Nur Insyirah Khan; Jessica Tan Wei Han; Crystal Wong; Yeo Jia Min | Team | —N/a | Philippines (PHI); W 3–0 | Thailand (THA); L 0–3 | Did not advance | 3rd place, bronze medalist(s) |

Mixed

| Athlete | Event | Round of 16 | Quarterfinal | Semifinal | Final | |
| Athlete | Event | Opposition Score | Opposition Score | Opposition Score | Opposition Score | Rank |
|---|---|---|---|---|---|---|
| Terry Hee; Tan Wei Han | Mixed | Phạm V H / Pham N T (VIE); W (21–15, 19–21, 21–15) | Chen T J / Peck Y W (MAS); L (19–21, 19–21) | Did not advance | | |
| Andy Kwek; Jin Yujia | Mixed | H Mengleap / P Chenda (CAM); L (20–22, 21–15) | Did not advance | | | |

== Basketball ==
=== 5x5 Basketball ===
Men's tournament

| Team | Event | Round-robin | | | | | | |
| Team | Event | Opposition Score | Opposition Score | Opposition Score | Opposition Score | Opposition Score | Opposition Score | Rank |
|---|---|---|---|---|---|---|---|---|
| Singapore men's | Men's 5x5 | Vietnam; L 83–86 | Philippines; L 37–88 | Malaysia; L 58–75 | Indonesia; L 61–91 | Thailand; L 53–90 | Cambodia; W 81–62 | 6 |

Women's tournament

| Team | Event | Round-robin | | | | | |
| Team | Event | Opposition Score | Opposition Score | Opposition Score | Opposition Score | Opposition Score | Rank |
|---|---|---|---|---|---|---|---|
| Singapore women's | Women's 5x5 | Vietnam; L 51–73 | Malaysia; L 37–72 | Thailand; L 40–91 | Philippines; L 61–88 | Indonesia; L 53–87 | 6 |

=== 3x3 Basketball ===
Men's tournament

| Team | Event | Round-robin | | | | | | |
| Team | Event | Opposition Score | Opposition Score | Opposition Score | Opposition Score | Opposition Score | Opposition Score | Rank |
|---|---|---|---|---|---|---|---|---|
| Singapore men's | Men's 3x3 | Indonesia; L 15–21 | Malaysia; L 16–21 | Vietnam; L 15–21 | Philippines; L 16–21 | Cambodia; L 13–21 | Thailand; L 11–21 | 6 |

Women's tournament

| Team | Event | Round-robin | | | | | | |
| Team | Event | Opposition Score | Opposition Score | Opposition Score | Opposition Score | Opposition Score | Opposition Score | Rank |
|---|---|---|---|---|---|---|---|---|
| Singapore women's | Women's 3x3 | Thailand; L 9–21 | Indonesia; L 8–21 | Malaysia; L 5–21 | Philippines; L 14–20 | Cambodia; L 6–21 | Vietnam; L 11–22 | 6 |

== Chess ==
Men

| Athlete | Event | Round 1 | Round 2 | Round 3 | Round 4 | Round 5 | Round 6 | Round 7 | Round 8 | Round 9 | Semifinal | Final | |
| Athlete | Event | Opposition Score | Opposition Score | Opposition Score | Opposition Score | Opposition Score | Opposition Score | Opposition Score | Opposition Score | Opposition Score | Opposition Score | Opposition Score | Rank |
|---|---|---|---|---|---|---|---|---|---|---|---|---|---|
| Tin Jingyao | Individual Standard | Prin (THA); W 1–0 | Li Tian (MAS); D 0.5–0.5 | M Ervan (INA); D 0.5–0.5 | Sanchez (PHI); D 0.5–0.5 | N Priasmoro (INA); D 0.5–0.5 | Truong (VIE); L 0–1 | Nay Oo K T (MYA); L 0–1 | Lik Zang (MAS); W 1–0 | Zaw Htun (MYA); L 0–1 | Zaw Htun (MYA); W 1–0 | —N/a | 3rd place, bronze medalist(s) |
| Tin Jingyao | Individual Rapid | Thanadon (THA); W 1–0 | Nay Oo K T (MYA); W 1–0 | Susanto (INA); L 0–1 | Li Tian (MAS); D 0.5–0.5 | Quang Liêm (VIE); W 1–0 | —N/a | | | | Azarya (INA); W 1.5–0.5 | Nguyen N T (VIE); L 0.5–1.5 | 2nd place, silver medalist(s) |
| Tin Jingyao | Individual Blitz | Quang Liêm (VIE); W 1–0 | Susanto (INA); L 0–1 | Sean (INA); W 1–0 | Li Tian (MAS); D 0.5–0.5 | Tuan Minh (VIE); W 1–0 | —N/a | | | | Quang Liêm (VIE); L 0–1 | Did not advance | 3rd place, bronze medalist(s) |

Women

| Athlete | Event | Round 1 | Round 2 | Round 3 | Round 4 | Round 5 | Round 6 | Round 7 | Round 8 | Round 9 | Semifinal | Final | |
| Athlete | Event | Opposition Score | Opposition Score | Opposition Score | Opposition Score | Opposition Score | Opposition Score | Opposition Score | Opposition Score | Opposition Score | Opposition Score | Opposition Score | Rank |
|---|---|---|---|---|---|---|---|---|---|---|---|---|---|
| Gong Qianyun | Individual Standard | Araya (THA); W 1–0 | Frayna (PHI); L 0–1 | Bao Tram (VIE); L 0–1 | Sukandar (INA); L 0–1 | Munajjah (MAS); D 0.5–0.5 | Ting Tan (MAS); W 1–0 | D A A Citra (INA); L 0–1 | V T Kim Phung (VIE); D 0.5–0.5 | J J Fronda (PHI); D 0.5–0.5 | Did not advance | | 7 |
| Gong Qianyun | Individual Rapid | Jia-Tien (MAS); W 1–0 | M A S D Moralde (PHI); L 0–1 | M S Buhagiar (THA); W 1–0 | P L T Nguyên (VIE); D 0.5–0.5 | A Citra (INA); W 1–0 | —N/a | | | | Thùy Dương (VIE); W 1.5–0.5 | P L T Nguyên (VIE); L 0–2 | 2nd place, silver medalist(s) |
| Gong Qianyun | Individual Blitz | Jia-Tien (MAS); D 0.5–0.5 | T M H Nguyễn (VIE); W 1–0 | P L T Nguyên (VIE); D 0.5–0.5 | C M I Sihite (INA); L 0–1 | Medina Warda (INA); W 1–0 | —N/a | | | | C M I Sihite (INA); L 0.5–1.5 | Did not advance | 3rd place, bronze medalist(s) |

== Football ==
Singapore women's football team won their first match in 37 years although it was with a 19-year absence from the Games.

| Team | Event | Round-robin | | | | |
| Team | Event | Opposition Score | Opposition Score | Opposition Score | Opposition Score | Rank |
|---|---|---|---|---|---|---|
| Singapore men's | Men's Football | Laos; D 2–2 | Thailand; L 0–5 | Cambodia; L 0–1 | Malaysia; D 2–2 | |

| Team | Event | Round-robin | | | |
| Team | Event | Opposition Score | Opposition Score | Opposition Score | Rank |
|---|---|---|---|---|---|
| Singapore women's | Women's Football | Thailand; L 0–3 | Laos; W 1–0 | Myanmar; L 0–1 | |
