= Myanmar National Chess Championship =

Annual chess tournament in Myanmar

The Myanmar National Chess Championship (Burmese: အမျိုးသားတံခွန်စိုက် စစ်တုရင် ပြိုင်ပွဲ) is an annual chess tournament organized by the Myanmar Chess Federation. With the exception of a hiatus in 1977, the tournament has been held annually since 1974. IM Wynn Zaw Htun is the most successful player, winning the championship nine times.

== Winners ==
No.	Year	Winner	Reference
1	1974	Kyaw Than	
2	1975	Maung Maung Sein	
3	1976	Khin Zaw Oo	
-	1977	not held	
4	1978	Tin Swam	
5	1979	Tin Swam	
6	1980	Aye Lwin	
7	1981	Win Myint Thein and Khin Maung Aye (tied)	
8	1982	Win Moe	
9	1983	Aye Lwin	
10	1984	Aye Lwin	
11	1985	Kyaw Myint Lay	
12	1986	Aye Lwin	
13	1987	Aye Lwin	
14	1988	Maung Maung Latt	
15	1989	Myo Naing	
16	1990	Zaw Win Lay	
17	1991	Aye Lwin	
18	1992	Myo Naing	
19	1993	Aung Thant Zin	
20	1994	Ko Ko Ohn	
21	1995	Zaw Win Lay	
22	1996	Zaw Win Lay	
23	1997	Aung Myo Hlaing	
24	1998	Ye Win Aung	
25	1999	Myo Naing	
26	2000	Wynn Zaw Htun	
27	2001	Nay Oo Kyaw Tun	
28	2002	Zaw Oo	
29	2003	Kyaw Kyaw Soe	
30	2004	Wynn Zaw Htun	
31	2005	Myo Naing	
32	2006	Wynn Zaw Htun	
33	2007	Zaw Win Lay	
34	2008	Aung Myo Hlaing	
35	2009	Zaw Oo	
36	2010	Myo Naing	
37	2011	Zaw Oo	
38	2012	Win Tun	
39	2013	Wynn Zaw Htun	
40	2014	Wynn Zaw Htun	
41	2015	Wynn Zaw Htun	
42	2016	Myint Han	
43	2017	Wynn Zaw Htun	
44	2018	Wynn Zaw Htun	
45	2019	Wynn Zaw Htun	
46	2020	Myint Han	
