= Myo Naing =

Burmese chess player (born 1964)

Personal information
- Born: 6 March 1964 (age 62) Myanmar

Chess career
- Country: Myanmar
- Title: International Master (1999)
- FIDE rating: 2284 (April 2020)
- Peak rating: 2545 (January 2000)

Myo Naing (Burmese: မျိုးနိုင်) is a Burmese chess International Master. He is a five-time Myanmar National Chess Championship winner (1989, 1992, 1999, 2005, 2010).
