= Table tennis at the 2021 SEA Games =

- Venue: Hải Dương Gymnasium
- Location: Hải Dương, Vietnam
- Dates: 13–20 May 2022
- Competitors: 53 from 7 nations

Table tennis at the 2021 SEA Games took place at Hải Dương Gymnasium, in Hải Dương, Vietnam from 13 to 20 May 2022.

== Participating nations ==
A total of 53 athletes from seven nations competed in table tennis at the 2021 Southeast Asian Games:

- Cambodia (7)
- Laos (3)
- Malaysia (8)
- Philippines (9)
- Singapore (8)
- Thailand (8)
- Vietnam (10)

== Competition schedule ==
The following is the competition schedule for the table tennis competitions:

P	Preliminaries	R16	Round of 16	¼	Quarterfinals	½	Semifinals	F	Final

Event↓/Date →	Fri 13	Sat 14	Sun 15	Mon 16	Tue 17	Wed 18		Thu 19	Fri 20	
Men's singles						P		P	½	F
Women's singles						P		P	½	F
Men's doubles					¼	½	F			
Women's doubles					¼	½	F			
Mixed doubles		R16	R16		¼	½	F			
Men's team	P	½	F							
Women's team	P	½	F							

== Medalists ==
Event	Gold	Silver	Bronze
Men's singles	Nguyễn Đức Tuân; Vietnam	Phakpoom Sanguansin; Thailand	Clarence Chew Zhe Yu; Singapore
Men's singles	Nguyễn Đức Tuân; Vietnam	Phakpoom Sanguansin; Thailand	Nguyễn Anh Tú; Vietnam
Women's singles	Orawan Paranang; Thailand	Suthasini Sawettabut; Thailand	Ho Ying; Malaysia
Women's singles	Orawan Paranang; Thailand	Suthasini Sawettabut; Thailand	Zeng Jian; Singapore
Men's doubles	Singapore; Clarence Chew Zhe Yu; Ethan Poh Shao Feng	Philippines; Richard Gonzales; John Russel Misal	Malaysia; Javen Choong; Wong Qi Shen
Men's doubles	Singapore; Clarence Chew Zhe Yu; Ethan Poh Shao Feng	Philippines; Richard Gonzales; John Russel Misal	Singapore; Koen Pang Yew En; Joshua Chua Shao Han
Women's doubles	Thailand; Orawan Paranang; Suthasini Sawettabut	Singapore; Zeng Jian; Zhou Jingyi	Malaysia; Karen Lyne Anak Dick; Ho Ying
Women's doubles	Thailand; Orawan Paranang; Suthasini Sawettabut	Singapore; Zeng Jian; Zhou Jingyi	Vietnam; Nguyễn Thị Nga; Trần Mai Ngọc
Mixed doubles	Singapore; Koen Pang Yew En; Wong Xin Ru	Singapore; Clarence Chew Zhe Yu; Zeng Jian	Thailand; Padasak Tanviriyavechakul; Suthasini Sawettabut
Mixed doubles	Singapore; Koen Pang Yew En; Wong Xin Ru	Singapore; Clarence Chew Zhe Yu; Zeng Jian	Thailand; Phakpoom Sanguansin; Orawan Paranang
Men's team	Thailand; Padasak Tanviriyavechakul; Pattaratorn Passara; Phakpoom Sanguansin; Sarayut Tancharoen	Malaysia; Leong Chee Feng; Javen Choong; Wong Qi Shen; Danny Ng Wann Sing	Singapore; Koen Pang Yew En; Ethan Poh Shao Feng; Clarence Chew Zhe Yu; Joshua Chua Shao Han
Men's team	Thailand; Padasak Tanviriyavechakul; Pattaratorn Passara; Phakpoom Sanguansin; Sarayut Tancharoen	Malaysia; Leong Chee Feng; Javen Choong; Wong Qi Shen; Danny Ng Wann Sing	Vietnam; Đinh Anh Hoàng; Đoàn Bá Tuấn Anh; Lê Đình Đức; Nguyễn Anh Tú; Nguyễn Đức Tuân
Women's team	Thailand; Orawan Paranang; Jinnipa Sawettabut; Suthasini Sawettabut; Wanwisa Aueawiriyayothin	Singapore; Goi Rui Xuan; Wong Xin Ru; Zeng Jian; Zhou Jingyi	Malaysia; Alice Chang Li Sian; Karen Lyne Anak Dick; Ho Ying; Tee Ai Xin
Women's team	Thailand; Orawan Paranang; Jinnipa Sawettabut; Suthasini Sawettabut; Wanwisa Aueawiriyayothin	Singapore; Goi Rui Xuan; Wong Xin Ru; Zeng Jian; Zhou Jingyi	Vietnam; Bùi Ngọc Lan; Nguyễn Khoa Diệu Khánh; Nguyễn Thị Nga; Trần Mai Ngọc; Vũ Hoài Thanh

== Medal table ==
* Host nation (Vietnam)

Rank	Nation	Gold	Silver	Bronze	Total
1	Thailand	4	2	2	8
2	Singapore	2	3	4	9
3	Vietnam*	1	0	4	5
4	Malaysia	0	1	4	5
5	Philippines	0	1	0	1
Totals (5 entries)		7	7	14	28
