= Zhengyi =

Zhengyi or Zheng Yi (Wade–Giles: Cheng I) may refer to:

- Zhengyi Dao, a Daoist movement founded by Zhang Daoling
- Zhengyi, a lich character from Dungeons & Dragons
- Zheng Yi (author) (郑义; born 1947), of Scarlet Memorial: Tales of Cannibalism in Modern China
- Zheng Yi (pirate) (鄭一; 1765–1807), a Chinese pirate of the South China Sea
- Zheng Yi (swimmer), American swimmer

== See also ==
- Cheng Yi (disambiguation)
