= Cheng Yi =

Cheng Yi (Wade–Giles: Ch'eng I) may refer to:

- Cheng Yi (Tang dynasty) (died 819), Tang dynasty chief councilor
- Cheng Yi (philosopher) (1033–1107), Song dynasty philosopher
- Cheng Yi (actor) (born 1990), Chinese actor
- Cheng Yi (成宜), Han dynasty warlord involved in the Battle of Tong Pass (211)

== See also ==
- Chen Yi (disambiguation)
- Zhengyi (disambiguation)
- Uttaradit, a city of Thailand, written as 程逸 for Chinese Mandarin
