= Zaw Oo =

Burmese chess player (born 1974)

Personal information
- Born: 28 June 1974 (age 52)

Chess career
- Country: Myanmar
- Title: FIDE Master
- FIDE rating: 2285 (April 2020)
- Peak rating: 2540 (January 2000)

Zaw Oo (Burmese: ဇော်ဦး) is a three-time Myanmar National Chess Championship winner (2002, 2009, and 2011).
