= Win Tun (chess player) =

Burmese chess player (born 1979)

Personal information
- Born: 1979 (age 46–47)

Chess career
- Country: Myanmar
- Title: FIDE Master (2017)
- FIDE rating: 2233 (April 2020)
- Peak rating: 2402 (April 2005)

Win Tun (Burmese: ဝင်းထွန်း) is a Burmese chess player. He is the winner of the 2012 Myanmar National Chess Championship, and the 2017 World Amateur Chess Championship (U-2300) class.
