= Myanmar Chess Federation =

Governing chess competition body in Myanmar

- Sport: Chess
- Jurisdiction: Myanmar
- Founded: 1972
- Affiliation: FIDE, Asian Chess Federation
- Affiliation date: 1990
- Regional affiliation: Asia
- Headquarters: Aung San Stadium
- Location: Yangon
- President: Maung Maung Lwin
- Secretary: Myo Zaw Min
- (Myanmar)

The Myanmar Chess Federation (Burmese: မြန်မာနိုင်ငံ စစ်တုရင် အဖွဲ့ချုပ်) is the governing body for chess competition in Myanmar. Founded in 1972, it joined FIDE, the International Chess Federation, in 1990. It is also a member of the ASEAN Chess Confederation.

The federation organizes the annual Myanmar National Chess Championship.

== See also ==
- Sittuyin (Traditional Burmese chess)
