= Myint Han =

Burmese chess player (born 1962)

Personal information
- Born: 21 February 1962 (age 64) Myanmar

Chess career
- Country: Myanmar
- Title: International Master (2016)
- Peak rating: 2460 (January 2000)

Myint Han (Burmese: မြင့်ဟန်) is a Burmese chess International Master. He is a two-time Myanmar National Chess Championship winner, finishing first in 2016 and 2020.
