= Aung Myo Hlaing =

Burmese chess player (born 1968)

Personal information
- Born: 6 May 1968 (age 58) Myanmar

Chess career
- Country: Myanmar
- Title: International Master (1999)
- FIDE rating: 2340 (November 2017)
- Peak rating: 2595 (January 2000)

Aung Myo Hlaing (Burmese: အောင်မျိုးလှိုင်; also known as Aung Aung (အောင်အောင်)) is a Burmese chess International Master. He is a two-time Myanmar National Chess Championship winner, finishing first in 1997 and 2008.
