= Aye Lwin (chess player) =

Burmese chess player (1958–2016)

Personal information
- Born: 3 August 1958 Mawlamyine, Myanmar
- Died: 19 November 2016 (aged 58) Yangon, Myanmar

Chess career
- Country: Myanmar
- Peak rating: 2495 (July 1999)

Aye Lwin (Burmese: အေးလွင်) was a six-time Burmese national chess championship winner. He won in 1980, 1983, 1984, 1986, 1987 and 1991.
