= Aya Majdi =

Qatari table tennis player

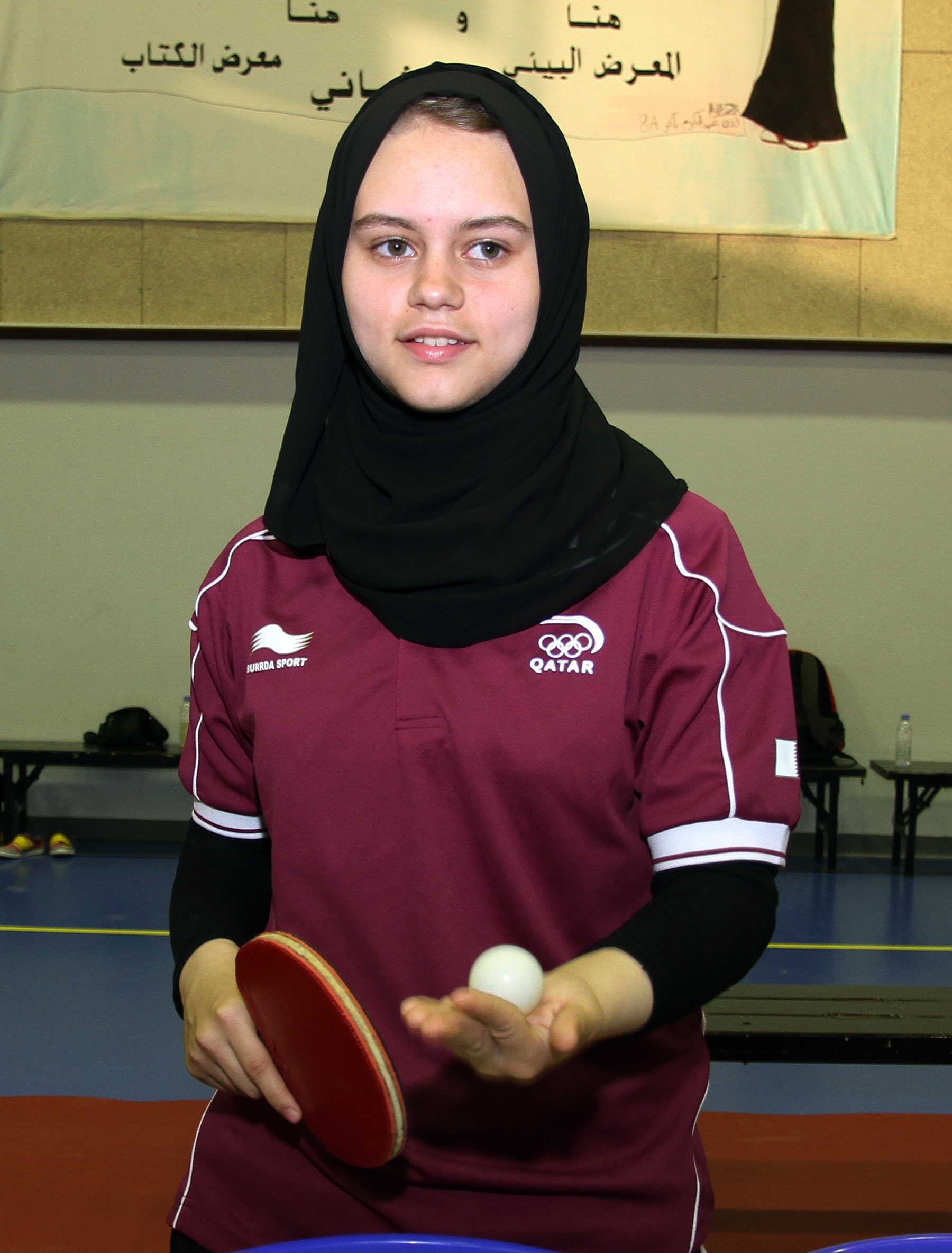
- Majdi in 2012

Personal information
- Born: 1 August 1994 (age 32) Alexandria, Egypt
- Height: 161 cm (5 ft 3 in)
- Weight: 57 kg (126 lb)

Sport
- Sport: Table tennis

Aya Mohamed Majdi (born 1 August 1994) is an Egyptian born Qatari table tennis player. Trained by the Chinese coach Su Li, Aya won three gold medals – singles, doubles and team – at the 2010 GCC Championship in Doha.

Majdi made her Olympic debut in 2012, having qualified through one of the IOC's Tripartite Commission invitation places.
