= Wynn Zaw Htun =

Burmese chess player (born 1982)

Personal information
- Born: 15 September 1982 (age 43) Bhamo, Kachin State, Myanmar

Chess career
- Country: Myanmar
- Title: International Master (2004)
- Peak rating: 2578 (April 2005)

Wynn Zaw Htun (Burmese: ဝင်းဇော်ထွန်း; born 15 September 1982) is a Burmese chess International Master. Currently the top ranked player in Myanmar, Wynn Zaw Htun has won the Myanmar National Chess Championship nine times: in 2000, 2004, 2006, 2013–2015, and 2017–2019
