= Nay Oo Kyaw Tun =

Burmese chess player (born 1975)

Personal information
- Born: 17 August 1975 (age 50)

Chess career
- Country: Myanmar
- Title: International Master (1999)
- FIDE rating: 2328 (September 2022)
- Peak rating: 2595 (January 2000)
- Peak ranking: No. 98 (January 2000)

Nay Oo Kyaw Tun (Burmese: နေဦးကျော်ထွန်း) is a Burmese chess International Master, and a Myanmar National Chess Championship winner (2001).
