= Batmönkhiin Bolor-Erdene =

Mongolian table tennis player

Personal information
- Nationality: Mongolia
- Born: 12 November 2002 (age 23) Ulaanbaatar, Mongolia
- Height: 170

Sport
- Sport: Table tennis

Batmönkhiin Bolor-Erdene (Mongolian: Батмөнхийн Болор-Эрдэнэ; born 12 November 2002) is a Mongolian table tennis player. A five-time Mongolian champion, she is the first Mongolian table tennis player to have competed at the Olympic Games, having competed in the women's singles event at the 2020 Summer Olympics.
