= Chen Yi =

Chen Yi may refer to:

- Xuanzang (602–664), born as Chen Yi, Chinese Buddhist monk in Tang Dynasty
- Chen Yi (Kuomintang) (1883–1950), Chief Executive of Taiwan Province
- Chen Yi (marshal) (1901–1972), Chinese Communist Party military commander and politician
- Chen Yi (composer) (born 1953), Chinese composer
- Rola Chen (born 1987), Japan-based Chinese gravure idol

== Sportspeople ==
- Chen Yi (tennis) (born 1986), Taiwanese tennis player
- Chen Yi (footballer) (born 1997), Chinese football player
- Chen Yi (field hockey, born 1997), Chinese field hockey player
- Chen Yi (field hockey, born 1998), Chinese field hockey player
- Chen Yi (swimmer) (born 2001), Chinese swimmer

== See also ==
- Cheng Yi (disambiguation)
