= Zeng Jian =

Singaporean table tennis player

Personal information
- Native name: 曾尖
- Nationality: Singaporean
- Born: 19 November 1996 (age 29) Loudi, Hunan, China
- Height: 159 cm (5 ft 3 in)

Sport
- Sport: Table tennis
- Club: Kinoshita Abyell Kanagawa
- Playing style: Right-handed shakehand grip
- Highest ranking: 17 (July 2017)
- Current ranking: 51 (15 July 2025)
Medal record
Women's Table Tennis
Representing Singapore
Asian Championships
Bronze medal – third place	2025 Bhubaneswar	Team
Commonwealth Games
Gold medal – first place	2022 Birmingham	Team
Gold medal – first place	2022 Birmingham	Doubles
Silver medal – second place	2022 Birmingham	Singles
Bronze medal – third place	2022 Birmingham	Mixed doubles
Southeast Asian Games
Gold medal – first place	2023 Cambodia	Singles
Silver medal – second place	2023 Cambodia	Mixed doubles
Silver medal – second place	2021 Vietnam	Doubles
Silver medal – second place	2021 Vietnam	Mixed doubles
Silver medal – second place	2021 Vietnam	Team
Bronze medal – third place	2021 Vietnam	Singles
Bronze medal – third place	2023 Cambodia	Team

Zeng Jian
- Chinese: 曾尖
Transcriptions
Standard Mandarin
- Hanyu Pinyin: Zēng Jiān

Zeng Jian (Chinese: 曾尖, born 19 November 1996) is a Chinese-born table tennis player. Born in China, she represents Singapore.

She won three Under-21 singles titles at the 2016 ITTF World Tour. She qualified and took part in the 2024 Summer Olympics at Paris.

== Career ==
In late 2014, Zeng registered with the Singapore Table Tennis Association with hopes to acquire Singaporean nationality and play for the Singapore national team. She acquired Singaporean nationality in November 2019.

Zeng took part in the 2022 Commonwealth Games held in Birmingham. She won two golds in the women's team and doubles events. In the singles event, she was leading 3 sets and eventually losing to compatriot Feng Tianwei 3-4 in all-Singapore final to claim the silver. She partnered Feng to defeat the Australian duo Jee Minhyung and Jian Fang Lay 3-0 in the finals.

At the 2022 World Team Table Tennis Championships at Chengdu, she led the team of Zhou Jingyi, Wong Xinru, Goi Rui Xuan and Zhang Wanling to top Group 4 by defeating Iran, Luxembourg & South Korea. The team qualifies to the knock-out rounds and won Czech Republic 3-1 in the Round of 16 to progress to the Quarter-Final to face 7th seed, Chinese Taipei. Zeng secured two points by defeating world no. 35 Cheng I-ching and world no. 22 Chen Szu-yu but was not enough for the win as the team fell to Chinese Taipei 2-3. Throughout this tournament, she notched an impressive streak of eight wins in seven days.
