= Deaths in September 2026 =

The following is a list of notable deaths in September 2026.

Entries for each day are listed alphabetically by surname. A typical entry lists information in the following sequence:

- Name, age, country of citizenship at birth, subsequent country of citizenship (if applicable), reason for notability, cause of death (if known), and reference.

== September 2026 ==
=== 1 ===
- Abu Hudhayfah al-Ansari, Yemeni Islamic militant, spokesman of the Islamic State (since 2023).
- Edith Barr, 90, Peruvian Creole singer.
- Enzo Bianchi, 83, Italian Roman Catholic friar, founder of the Bose Monastic Community, kidney failure.
- Geles Cabrera, 100, Mexican sculptor.
- Barry Cleavin, 86, New Zealand printmaker.
- Galopin Des Champs, 10, French Thoroughbred racehorse, leg injury.
- Jacqueline Dieudonné, 87, French Olympic gymnast (1956, 1960).
- Joe Feeney, 89, Irish Olympic freestyle wrestler (1960, 1964).
- Gracindo Júnior, 83, Brazilian actor (Esplendor, Rei Davi, The Emerald Forest) and film director.
- Edythe Harrison, 91, American politician, member of the Virginia House of Delegates (1980–1983).
- John Hastie, 93, New Zealand cricket umpire.
- Charles Hatcher, 87, American politician, member of the U.S. (1981–1993) and the Georgia House of Representatives (1973–1980).
- He Yong, 57, Chinese rock musician.
- Konrad Jarausch, 85, German-American historian, drowned.
- Carla Jeffery, 33, American actress (Zombies, Curb Your Enthusiasm, American Vandal).
- Charles Josselin, 88, French politician, MEP (1979–1981), five-time deputy, senator (2006–2008).
- Alan Knight, 65, English footballer (Portsmouth) and coach (Horndean, Dorchester Town), prostate cancer.
- Khrist Kopetzky, 44, French rugby union player (Stado Tarbes Pyrénées Rugby, Blagnac Rugby, national rugby sevens team).
- Jean Lopez, 86, Filipina actress.
- Harold Gene Lucas, 74, American convicted murderer (murder of Jill Piper), execution by lethal injection.
- Ronald McCoy, 96, Malaysian peace and anti-nuclear activist.
- Jonathan Meléndez, 38, Mexican keyboardist (Camilo Séptimo), shot.
- Hinson Mosley, 93, American politician, member of the Georgia House of Representatives (1992–2006).
- Heinz Mußmann, 80, German Olympic rower (1972).
- Yuri Nakamura, 44, Japanese-born South Korean actress (Romantics Anonymous, Beyond Goodbye, Good Doctor), rectal cancer.
- Jean-Paul Rappeneau, 94, French film director (The Married Couple of the Year Two, Cyrano de Bergerac) and screenwriter (That Man from Rio).
- József Rusznyák, 79, Hungarian Olympic wrestler (1968, 1972).
- Annette Saint-Pierre, 101, Canadian educator, writer and publisher.
- Carlos Horacio Salinas, 70, Argentine footballer (Boca Juniors, Independiente Medellín, Racing de Córdoba).
- Jim Sockwell, 84, American ceramicist.
- Sylvia Spring, 84, Canadian feminist writer, filmmaker and activist.
- Eberhard Vogel, 83, German football player (Carl Zeiss Jena, East Germany national team) and manager (Hannover 96), Olympic bronze medallist (1964, 1972).

=== 2 ===
- Jimmy Batten, 70, English boxer, complications from Parkinson's disease.
- Frank Bridel, 101, Swiss journalist (Gazette de Lausanne) and writer.
- Edmée Buclin-Favre, 99, Swiss feminist activist and lawyer.
- Chen Kuan-tai, 80, Hong Kong actor (The Chinese Boxer, Vengeance, Heroes Two) and choreographer, cerebral haemorrhage.
- Hugh Curran, 82, Scottish footballer (Norwich City, Wolverhampton, national team).
- Rich DeMartino, 87, American bridge player.
- Raif Dizdarević, 99, Bosnian politician, president of the Presidency of Yugoslavia (1988–1989), minister of foreign affairs (1984–1987), and chairman of the Presidency of Bosnia and Herzegovina (1978–1982).
- Rachel Blau DuPlessis, 84, American poet and essayist.
- Eraj Ravindra Fernando, 57, Sri Lankan politician, mayor of Hambantota (2014–2023).
- Tony Gatlif, 77, French film director (Latcho Drom, Gadjo dilo, Je suis né d'une cigogne).
- Ivan Gudelj, 66, Croatian football player (Hajduk Split, Yugoslavia national team) and manager (Primorac Stobreč).
- Hasegawa Yoshikazu, 96, Japanese vertebrate paleontologist.
- Stanislas Hutin, 95, French Jesuit seminarian and anti-war activist.
- Norman Irwin, 107, Northern Irish World War II veteran and centenarian.
- Robert A. Kyle, 98, American academic.
- Ken Lancaster, 83, American politician, member of the Alaska House of Representatives (2001–2003).
- Lau Siu-ming, 94, Hong Kong dancer and actor (A Chinese Ghost Story, The Swordsman, The Butterfly Murders).
- Peter Leaver, 81, British barrister, judge, and football administrator, chief executive of the Premier League (1997–1999).
- Olavi Leimuvirta, 90, Finnish artistic gymnast, Olympic bronze medalist (1956).
- David McDermott, 38, English footballer (Walsall, Kidderminster Harriers, York City).
- Raymond Pointu, 86, French sports journalist (Le Monde, Agence France-Presse).
- Harald Rensvik, 80, Norwegian civil servant, director of the Norwegian Climate and Pollution Agency (1987–1990, 1992–1996).
- Francisco Reséndez, 85, Mexican voice actor and dubbing director.
- Anil Sharma, 63, Indian politician, Uttar Pradesh MLA (2002–2012, since 2017).
- Alphonso Smith, 40, American football player (Wake Forest Demon Deacons, Detroit Lions, Denver Broncos), suicide.
- Gloria Steinem, 92, American feminist and journalist (New York, Ms.), co-founder of the Women's Media Center.
- Pierre Tordo, 86, French football player (Sedan, AS Béziers) and manager (SO Châtellerault).
- Tucker Budzyn, 8, American golden retriever, infection.
- Wilfried Wesemael, 76, Belgian Olympic road racing cyclist (1972), winner of the 1979 Tour de Suisse.
- Cassandra Wilson, 70, American jazz singer, two-time Grammy winner (1997, 2009).

=== 3 ===
- Klaus Becker, 91, German civil servant, Regierungspräsident of Lüneburg (1981–1990).
- Isaac M. Daniel, 92, American engineer.
- Ramón Espinar Gallego, 72, Spanish politician, member of the Assembly of Madrid (1983–1995).
- Brian Fallon, 93, Irish art critic.
- Thomas Graham, 92, American diplomat.
- Bernard Haisch, 77, German-born American astrophysicist, complications from Parkinson's disease.
- Keyvan Khosrovani, 88, Iranian architect and lighting designer.
- Ritu Khullar, 62, Canadian jurist, chief justice of Alberta (since 2022), cancer.
- Husky Kihal, 64, French actor (Astrid et Raphaëlle, The Villain, Quartier V.I.P.).
- Enos Mafokate, 80, South African equestrian.
- Győző Martos, 76, Hungarian footballer (Ferencváros, national team).
- Paul Matthews, 79, English footballer (Mansfield Town, Leicester City, Northampton Town).
- Harish Chandra Mishra, 67, Indian judge, lokayukta of Delhi (since 2022).
- Fabio Mussi, 78, Italian politician, minister of university and research (2006–2008) and deputy (1992–2008).
- Milan Ohnisko, 61, Czech poet, editor and dissident, signatory of Charter 77.
- Michel Paulin, 92, French actor (Les Cinq Dernières Minutes, Nuits Rouges).
- Joseph F. Rice, 72, American lawyer.
- Ahmad Muhammad Sani II, 83, Nigerian traditional ruler, emir of Gumel (since 1980).
- Iwan Setiawan, 68, Indonesian football manager (Persibom, Serpong City, Persibo Bojonegoro).
- Huguette St-Denis, 61, Canadian screenwriter (Watatatow, The Parent Family) and actress.
- Jim Sutton, 91, American Hall of Fame stock contractor.
- Jason Walker, 57, New Zealand-born Australian country musician and writer.

=== 4 ===
- Shin'ichi Abe, 76, Japanese mangaka, mandibular gland cancer.
- André Brasilier, 96, French painter and lithographer.
- Yves Brunier, 83, French animator, puppeteer and actor (L'Île aux enfants).
- Craig Douglas, 85, English singer ("Only Sixteen") and actor (It's Trad, Dad!).
- Karen Dubinsky, 68, Canadian historian, lung cancer.
- Camilo Escalona, 71, Chilean politician, senator (2006–2014), prostate cancer.
- Zenyazen Escobar, 42, Mexican politician, deputy (since 2024), shot. (body discovered on this date)
- Constantin Floros, 96, Greek-German musicologist.
- Jorge Gallego, 86, Colombian footballer (Deportivo Cali, Deportes Tolima, national team).
- Steve Gollschewski, 67, Australian police officer, commissioner of the Queensland Police Service (2024–2026), lung cancer.
- Jan-Åke Gustafsson, 83, Swedish scientist.
- Lars Ivar Hansen, 78, Norwegian historian.
- Joe Harkness, 39, British mental health activist, naturalist and writer.
- S. R. Janakiraman, 98, Indian Carnatic singer and musicologist.
- Ulrich C. Knoepflmacher, 95, German-born American literary scholar.
- Javad Mojabi, 86, Iranian poet and writer, cancer.
- Tahir Nikšić, 76, Bosnian actor and theatre artist.
- Jerry Oates, 78, American professional wrestler.
- Richard O'Sullivan, 82, English actor (Man About the House, Robin's Nest, Dick Turpin).
- Edward Raradza, 79, Zimbabwean tobacco farmer and politician, MP (2008–2013).
- Pedro Rodríguez, 93, Spanish Roman Catholic priest and theologian (Opus Dei).
- François Rossé, 81, French composer, pianist and academic teacher (Conservatoire de Bordeaux).
- Jon Small, 79, American drummer (The Hassles, Attila) and music video director ("Walk This Way"), cancer.
- Henry Lewis Suggs, 84, American historian.
- Billy Teare, 75, Irish storyteller.
- Alexey Vishnevetsky, 60, Russian journalist (Moskovskaya Pravda, Parlamentskaya Gazeta). (death announced on this date)
- Don Wilhelms, 96, American geologist.
- Francis Grosvenor, 8th Earl of Wilton, 92, British-Australian aristocrat.

=== 5 ===
- Robert Alexy, 80, German jurist and legal philosopher.
- Albert Alós, 86, Spanish-born Nigerian engineer, academic and missionary.
- Thérèse Brenet, 90, French composer.
- Jean-Pierre Clar, 84, French rugby league (US Villeneuve XIII, national team) and rugby union player (SU Agen).
- C. Richard D'Amato, 83, American politician and Navy Reserve captain, member of the Maryland House of Delegates (1999–2003).
- Felton Earls, 84, American child psychiatrist and epidemiologist.
- Andy Fish, 60, American graphic novelist, blood cancer.
- Alberto Iribarne, 76, Argentine lawyer and politician, minister of justice (2005–2007).
- Otto Jelinek, 86, Czech-born Canadian Olympic figure skater (1960) and politician, MP (1972–1993) and minister of national revenue (1989–1993), complications from Parkinson's disease.
- Torstein Jøssang, 92, Norwegian physicist.
- Peter Katsambanis, 60, Australian politician, Victoria MLC (1996–2002) and Western Australia MLC (2013–2017) and MLA (2017–2021).
- Shirley Strum Kenny, 92, American academic administrator, president of Stony Brook University (1994–2009) and Queens College (1985–1994).
- Serhat Kılıç, 51, Turkish actor (Kuruluş: Osman, Maraşlı, Mehmed: Fetihler Sultanı).
- Georgina Lightning, 63, Canadian film director (Older than America), screenwriter and actress, equestrian accident.
- Bruce Lunsford, 78, American politician and attorney.
- Erni Mangold, 99, Austrian actress (Before Sunrise, Therapy for a Vampire, The Forester of the Silver Wood).
- Georgy Matyukhin, 91, Russian economist, governor of the Central Bank of Russia (1992).
- Frank McDonald, 76, Irish environmental journalist (The Irish Times).
- Michael Mendl, 82, German actor (Downfall, 14 Days to Life, Dark), skin cancer.
- Resil B. Mojares, 83, Filipino author, historian and literary critic.
- Joe Morgan, 95, American baseball player (Cleveland Indians, St. Louis Cardinals) and manager (Boston Red Sox).
- Robin Morgan, 85, American poet, writer (Sisterhood Is Powerful) and feminist, co-founder of the Women's Media Center, complications from Parkinson's disease.
- Radim Raděvič, 59, Czech ice hockey player (TJ Gottwaldov, Czechoslovakia national team).
- Klaus Wanger, 85, Liechtensteiner politician, member (1993–2009) and president (2001–2009) of the Landtag of Liechtenstein.
- Andy Williams, 48, American guitarist (Every Time I Die) and professional wrestler (AEW, ROH).

=== 6 ===
- Rudy Ariffin, 73, Indonesian politician, governor of South Kalimantan (2005–2015) and regent of Banjar (2000–2005).
- Israël Isaac Besançon, 81, French-Israeli rabbi and painter.
- Hadassah Carlebach, 98, Russian-American Holocaust survivor and memoirist.
- Iván Carvajal, 78, Ecuadorian poet.
- Bill Dundee, 82, Scottish-born Australian professional wrestler (AWA, NWA, WCW).
- Rosa Maria Duran, 99, Spanish-born Mexican translator and teacher.
- Allen Engel, 93, Canadian politician, Saskatchewan MLA (1971–1975, 1978–1986), complications from Parkinson's disease.
- Edward Field, 102, American poet.
- Jim Geoghan, 79, American television writer and producer (The Suite Life of Zack & Cody, Family Matters, Silver Spoons), complications from dementia.
- Joji Hirota, 78, Japanese percussionist and composer.
- Walter Kershaw, 85, English artist.
- Guus Kouwenhoven, 84, Dutch arms dealer.
- Sudivya Kumar, 56, Indian politician, Jharkhand MLA (since 2019), heart attack.
- Johan Mijail, 36, Dominican writer, journalist and artist.
- John O'Leary, 72, American football player (Montreal Alouettes).
- Rosa Fung Pineda, 90–94, Peruvian archaeologist.
- Tom Rinaldi, 77, American winemaker.
- Juan Guillermo Ríos, 78, Colombian journalist.
- Nina Shipman, 88, American actress (Say One for Me, Blue Denim, The Oregon Trail).
- Hristo Spasov, 38, Bulgarian footballer (Chepinets, Naftex, Bansko), heart attack.
- Matt Suhey, 68, American football player (Chicago Bears).
- Stephen Walker, 61, English-born Northern Irish journalist (BBC Northern Ireland) and author.
- Neville Withers, 85, Australian footballer (Collingwood).

=== 7 ===
- K. Achuthan, 76, Indian politician, Kerala MLA (1996–2016).
- Gastón Acurio Velarde, 95, Peruvian politician, minister of development (1965–1967) and senator (1980–1992).
- Admire Moon, 23, Japanese Thoroughbred racehorse.
- Sir Richard Alston, 77, British choreographer.
- Hafidh Ameir Hassan, 80, Tanzanian agriculturalist, first gentleman (since 2021), heart disease.
- Joseph Arnaouti, 90, Syrian Armenian Catholic hierarch, patriarchal exarch of Damascus (1997–2023).
- Tony Buss, 87, English cricketer (Sussex).
- David Cobb, 63, American activist and presidential candidate.
- Jonathan Cooper, 76, American luthier.
- Norberto Galasso, 90, Argentine historian.
- Great Gidayū, 67, Japanese actor (Ikinai, Kikujiro).
- Marty Lowe, 54, American football player (St. Louis Stampede, Texas Terror) and coach (Georgia Force), kidney cancer.
- Simon Lui, 62, Hong Kong actor (Troublesome Night, Last Ghost Standing, Vulgaria), cancer.
- Stanisław Małkowski, 82, Polish Roman Catholic priest.
- Bello Mandiya, 62, Nigerian politician, senator (2019–2023).
- Iskhak Mashbash, 96, Russian poet.
- Silvio Meli, 72, Maltese judge.
- Marc Mercier, 68, French professional wrestler (FFCP) and stuntman (Asterix and Obelix vs. Caesar), oesophageal cancer.
- Galina Mishenina, 76, Russian rower, Olympic bronze medallist (1976).
- Eric Pearce, 94, Australian field hockey player, Olympic silver (1968) and bronze medalist (1964).
- Roger Pelletier, 81, Canadian ice hockey player (Philadelphia Flyers).
- Rihards Pīks, 84, Latvian politician and film director, MP (1998–2004), MEP (2004–2009) and minister of foreign affairs (2004).
- Vadim Popov, 86, Belarusian politician, speaker of the House of Representatives (2000–2004, 2007–2008).
- Nina Popova, 81, Russian actress (Day by Day, Investigation Led by Experts, Mickey Spillane's Mike Hammer).
- Monito Rodríguez, 80, Mexican footballer (Zacatepec, Club América, national team).
- R. Sarath, 65, Indian film director (Sayahnam, The Desire, Buddhanum Chaplinum Chirikkunnu), kidney disease.
- Lucien Smith, 37, American contemporary artist.
- Ken Todd, 69, English footballer (Wolverhampton Wanderers, Port Vale, Portsmouth).
- Georg Westenfelder, 91, German organ builder.
- David Worth, 86, American film director (Kickboxer, Warrior of the Lost World) and cinematographer (Bloodsport).

=== 8 ===
- Margaret Bedggood, 87, New Zealand legal scholar, chief human rights commissioner (1989–1994).
- Harry Burrows, 85, English footballer (Aston Villa, Stoke City, Plymouth Argyle).
- Philippe Caillard, 102, French choral conductor.
- Monowar Hossain Chowdhury, 78, Bangladeshi politician, MP (1999–2014, 2021–2024), heart attack.
- Gabriel Contant, 95, Canadian painter.
- Blanche d'Alpuget, 82, Australian writer (Turtle Beach, The Young Lion), complications from influenza.
- William Henry Draper III, 98, American venture capitalist, chairman of EXIM (1981–1986) and administrator of the UNDP (1986–1993).
- Manuel Dueso, 73, Spanish actor, dramatist and theatre director.
- Silvia Ederra, 43, Spanish handball player (BM Bera Bera, national team).
- Takao Jinnouchi, 93, Japanese politician, minister of justice (1999) and MP (1988–2007).
- Ismael Laguna, 83, Panamanian Hall of Fame boxer, WBC lightweight champion (1965, 1970).
- Elio Lo Cascio, 78, Italian historian.
- Serge Losique, 94, Canadian writer, festival organizer and academic.
- Vlasta Maček, 74, Croatian chess player.
- André Navez, 74, Belgian politician, Walloon deputy (1999–2004), mayor of Binche (2001–2006).
- Alexandr Pashchenko, 81, Russian singer, actor and director, People's Artist of Russia (2002).
- Robert Poinard, 77, French priest, journalist and chaplain.
- André Pronovost, 90, Canadian ice hockey player (Montreal Canadiens, Boston Bruins, Detroit Red Wings).
- Pat Senatore, 91, American jazz bassist.
- Peter Sincock, 78, Australian cricketer (South Australia).
- Tung Chee-hwa, 89, Hong Kong politician, chief executive (1997–2005), vice chairman of the NCCPPCC (2005–2023), and member of the Executive Council (1992–1996).
- Pierfranco Vianelli, 79, Italian cyclist, Olympic champion (1968).
- Tom Whitestone, 62, American sport coach, associate athletic director at the University of North Carolina at Charlotte (1987–2024), cancer.

=== 9 ===
- Óscar Mario Beteta, 70, Mexican journalist and radio host (Radio Fórmula), cancer.
- Aleksey Borovitin, 72, Russian Olympic ski jumper (1976, 1980).
- Ranee Brylinski, 69, American mathematician.
- Paul Butzer, 98, German mathematician.
- Malcolm Dawes, 82, English footballer (Hartlepool, Aldershot, Workington), complications from dementia.
- Paddy Doherty, 92, Irish Gaelic footballer (Down).
- Andrzej Elżanowski, 76, Polish palaeontologist.
- Jean Galard, 77, French organist.
- Samuel Gelblung, 82, Argentine journalist (Crónica TV), respiratory failure.
- Isao Harimoto, 86, Japanese Hall of Fame baseball player (Hokkaido Nippon-Ham Fighters, Yomiuri Giants, Chiba Lotte Marines).
- Albert Horsfall, 84, Nigerian intelligence officer, director of the National Intelligence Agency (1986–1990) and the State Security Service (1990–1992).
- Bryan Isacks, 90, American geophysicist.
- Jean-Pierre Jouët, 99, French shipbuilder and event organiser.
- Paddy Keenan, 76, Irish uilleann piper (The Bothy Band).
- Hyacinth Knight, 86, Jamaican politician, MP (1983–1989).
- Arvo Kruusement, 98, Estonian film director (Spring, Summer, Autumn) and actor.
- Edward H. Lehner, 93, American politician, member of the New York State Assembly (1973–1980).
- Tolofuaivalelei Falemoe Leiʻataua, 76, Samoan politician, member (1996, 2001–2016) and speaker (2006–2011) of the Legislative Assembly.
- Giorgos Mazonakis, 54, Greek laïko singer, cardiac arrest.
- Mike McFarland, 56, American voice actor (Dragon Ball Z, Fullmetal Alchemist, Attack on Titan), glioblastoma.
- Barry Melrose, 70, Canadian-born American ice hockey player (Toronto Maple Leafs), coach (Los Angeles Kings) and sportscaster (ESPN), complications from Parkinson's disease.
- Jackson Nascimento, 102, Brazilian football player (Athletico Paranaense, Corinthians) and manager (Athletico Paranaense).
- Margaret Rizza, 97, English composer and music teacher.
- Alexander Sharovsky, 78, Azerbaijani actor and theatre director.
- Alister Smart, 90, Australian actor (Play School, Number 96, The Sullivans) and director.
- Dame Heather Steel, 86, British jurist, justice of the High Court (1993–2001).
- Gaylyn Studlar, 73, American feminist, and film and media critic.
- Tomaso Tommasi di Vignano, 79, Italian energy distribution industry executive, chairman of Hera (2002–2023).
- Barry Whitbread, 77, English football player (Lancaster City, Altrincham) and manager (Singapore national team).
- Helmut Wiesinger, 74, Austrian actor.
- June Wyndham Davies, 97, British television producer and director.
- Elio Zamuto, 85, Italian actor (The Sicilian Checkmate, Shadows Unseen, Silence the Witness).

=== 10 ===
- Manel Abeysekera, 93, Sri Lankan diplomat.
- Chuni Lal Bhagat, 93, Indian politician, Punjab MLA (1997–2002, 2007–2017).
- Vsevolod Bogdanov, 82, Russian journalist, chairman of the RUJ (1992–2017). (death announced on this date)
- Claudio Carsughi, 93, Italian-born Brazilian sports journalist (Corriere dello Sport, Rádio Jovem Pan, Quatro Rodas).
- Michael M. Cernea, 94, Romanian-born sociologist and anthropologist.
- Daniel Conahan, 72, American convicted murderer, execution by lethal injection.
- Cathie Craigie, 72, Scottish politician, MSP (1999–2011).
- Marilyn Edwards, 88, American politician, member of the Arkansas House of Representatives (2003–2009).
- Futagodake Takeshi, 82, Japanese sumo wrestler, hepatocellular carcinoma.
- Penny Gillies, 75, Australian Olympic hurdler (1972, 1980).
- Felicity Green, 100, British fashion journalist and newspaper executive (Daily Mirror).
- Artur Heras, 81, Spanish painter.
- Khalid Mahmood, 84, Pakistani field hockey player, Olympic champion (1968).
- Bheki Maphalala, Swazi jurist.
- Phyllis MacMahon, 91, Irish actress (10 Rillington Place, Phantom Thread, The Magdalene Sisters).
- Bob McKay, 78, American Hall of Fame football player (Texas Longhorns, Cleveland Browns, New England Patriots).
- Gary Myers, 76, American racing driver (NASCAR).
- Ajazdin Nuhi, 46, Serbian footballer (Čukarički, Zeta, OFK Beograd), suicide.
- Roger Simon, 78, American journalist (Politico, Chicago Tribune, Bloomberg News) and writer, pneumonia.
- Josep María Trías de Bes, 81, Spanish politician, deputy (1980–1993, 1996).

=== 11 ===
- Princess Astrid, Mrs. Ferner, 94, Norwegian royal.
- Varinder Singh Bajwa, 82, Indian politician, MP (2004–2010), cardiac arrest.
- Chaudhry Mehmood Bashir, 88, Pakistani politician, minister for law (2018) and MNA (1997–1999, since 2008).
- Naseebullah Bazai, Pakistani politician, senator (2018–2024). (death announced on this date)
- Paul Bender, 93, American attorney and legal scholar.
- Bain Boehlke, 87, American actor (Fargo, Four Boxes) and theatre director.
- Julia Boffey, 73, English academic.
- Emma Bonino, 78, Italian politician, minister of foreign affairs (2013–2014), senator (2008–2013, 2018–2022) and twice MEP, complications from small-cell carcinoma.
- Marcel Carfantan, 93, French racing cyclist.
- Dame Margaret Clark, 85, New Zealand political scientist.
- Raffaele Costa, 90, Italian politician, deputy (1976–2006), minister of transport (1993–1994) and twice of health.
- Bruce M. Davis, 83, American convicted murderer (Manson family).
- Tapas Dey, 84, Indian politician, Tripura MLA (1972–1977).
- Robert E. Dickinson, 86, American meteorologist.
- Ketaki Kushari Dyson, 86, Indian-born British writer and scholar.
- W. J. Frecklington, 77, Australian carriage maker (Australian State Coach, Diamond Jubilee State Coach), cancer.
- Harry Kirk, 82, Scottish footballer (Scunthorpe United, Stockport County, Darlington).
- Lungskull, 20, French rapper, drug overdose.
- Elaine Mokhtefi, 97, American anti-colonial activist and writer.
- Anthony Page, 90, Indian-born British film (Inadmissible Evidence, My Zinc Bed) and stage (A Doll's House) director, Tony winner (1997).
- Solomon Pappaiah, 90, Indian scholar and actor (Boys, Sivaji: The Boss).
- Brent Peterson, 68, Canadian ice hockey player (Buffalo Sabres, Vancouver Canucks) and coach (Nashville Predators), complications from Parkinson's disease.
- Rachel Rabin, 101, Israeli educator and activist.
- Jesús Rico, 73, Mexican footballer (Atlante F.C., Real Club España, national team).
- Jeremy Thomas, 77, British film producer (The Last Emperor, Sexy Beast, Naked Lunch), Oscar winner (1988).
- Peter Thompson, 73, Australian broadcast journalist and educator (Talking Heads, This Day Tonight).
- Yuca, 75, Peruvian comedian and actor (La paisana Jacinta en búsqueda de Wasaberto, ¡Asu mare! 2).

=== 12 ===
- Naseer al-Chaderchi, 90, Iraqi politician.
- Ellen Brandom, 84, American politician, member of the Missouri House of Representatives (2007–2013).
- Michael Brennan, 83, British-American economist and academic.
- Tone Capone, 59, American hip-hop producer ("I Got 5 on It").
- George Chuvalo, 89, Canadian boxer and actor (The Fly).
- Iris Engstrand, 91, American academic.
- Lars Herseth, 80, American politician, member of the South Dakota House of Representatives (1975–1986) and Senate (1989–1996), cancer.
- Sérgio Toledo Machado, 81, Brazilian Olympic basketball player (1964, 1968).
- Abdul Jalil Mastan, 70, Indian politician, six-time Bihar MLA.
- Hidetoshi Nakanishi, 68, Japanese Olympic judoka (1984), stomach cancer.
- Cal Nichols, 84, Canadian businessman, chairman of the Edmonton Investors Group (2000–2007).
- Nikolay Noev, 38, Russian-born Tajik Olympic wrestler (2012).
- Bernice Offei, 63, Ghanaian gospel singer.
- Nikolay Podgornov, 77, Russian politician, governor of Vologda Oblast (1991–1996).
- Tanchum Portnoy, 75, American Jewish music composer.
- Mohammad Hadi Saleh, 79, Iraqi Marxist activist, heart attack.
- Yves Schlirf, Belgian comics editor (Kana).
- Byron Sher, 98, American politician, member of the California State Assembly (1980–1996) and Senate (1996–2004).
- Agni Deo Singh, 60, Fijian politician, MP (2006, since 2022).
- Carles Solà, 81, Spanish academic administrator and politician, rector of the UAB (1994–2002).
- Rafael Sorkin, 80, American physicist.
- James Storme, 83, Belgian football player (Gent, Standard Liège) and manager (Oostende), cardiac arrest.
- Bamanga Tukur, 90, Nigerian politician, governor of Gongola State (1983).
- Povilas Varanauskas, 85, Lithuanian politician, signatory of the Act of the Re-Establishment.
- Sir Edmund Verney, 6th Baronet, 76, British landowner.
- Hartmut Welker, 84, German opera singer.

=== 13 ===
- Siddique Ahmed, 63, Indian politician, Assam MLA (2001–2016, 2021–2026), cancer.
- Eugenia Apostol, 100, Filipino journalist and publisher, founder of the Philippine Daily Inquirer.
- Ian Berry, 92, English photojournalist.
- René Bianchi, 92, French cyclist, Olympic silver medallist (1956).
- BloodHound Q50, 22, American rapper, shot.
  - Richard G. Capen Jr., 92, American diplomat.
- Rodney Charters, 80, New Zealand cinematographer (24, The Pretender, Going in Style).
- Cheetah Chrome, 71, American guitarist (Dead Boys, Rocket from the Tombs) and songwriter ("Sonic Reducer").
- Chung Ho-yong, 94, South Korean politician, general, and convicted traitor, minister of the interior (1987) and defense (1987–1988).
- Jim Collier, 87, American football player (New York Giants, Washington Redskins).
- Pinula Contreras, 91, Guatemalan footballer (Comunicaciones, national team).
- Marc de La Ménardière, 44, French environmental activist and filmmaker, cancer.
- Mohamed Garfi, 77, Tunisian musicologist, composer and conductor.
- Mary Gaudron, 83, Australian judge, justice of the High Court (1987–2003).
- Anton Grunis, 46, Russian military commander.
- Charles Hampden-Turner, 91, British management philosopher.
- Jing Yidan, 71, Chinese television presenter (China Central Television), complications from a cerebral hemorrhage.
- Ann Kaiser, 78, American academic.
- Timothy Lawson, 82, British Olympic field hockey player (1968).
- Deirdre McDermott, 60, Irish book publisher.
- Luděk Mikloško, 64, Czech footballer (West Ham United, Baník Ostrava, national team), cancer.
- Liang Shaoji, 81, Chinese conceptual artist.
- Jimmy Revie, 79, British boxer, complications from dementia.
- Robert Szreder, 79–80, Polish violinist.
- Yehuda Aharon Vidovsky, 107, Polish-born Israeli businessman and Holocaust survivor.
- Kari Wærness, 87, Norwegian sociologist.
- Win Aung, 60, Burmese footballer (national team), lung disease.

=== 14 ===
- Aracy Amaral, 96, Brazilian art historian and curator, director of the Pinacoteca do Estado de São Paulo (1975–1979) and the Museum of Contemporary Art, University of São Paulo (1982–1986).
- David Arnason, 86, Canadian author and poet.
- Claude Bachand, 75, Canadian politician, MP (1993–2011).
- Didier Billet, 68, French footballer (Olympique Marseille, Olympique Alès).
- Ray Billington, 92, Welsh middle-distance runner.
- Gopiram Bargayn Burabhakat, 101, Indian sattriya classical dancer.
- Pete Byrne, 74, English singer (Naked Eyes) and songwriter ("Promises, Promises").
- Bodil Cappelen, 96, Norwegian visual artist and writer.
- Louis Caron, 84, Canadian journalist and writer (He Shoots, He Scores), heart attack.
- Dory Chamoun, 94, Lebanese politician, MP (2009–2018).
- Pierre de Chastonay, 95, Swiss politician, member of the Grand Council of Valais (1969–1977), MP (1975–1987).
- Andy Gallagher, 89, Irish hurler (Offaly).
- Judy Gumbo, 83, Canadian-born American activist (Youth International Party), complications from dementia.
- Sheila Kennelly, 88, British-born Australian actress (Number 96, Kingswood Country, Home and Away).
- Aleksandr Kupriyanov, 74, Russian footballer (Krylia Sovetov Kuybyshev).
- Ken Laufman, 94, Canadian ice hockey player, Olympic silver (1960) and bronze (1956) medallist.
- Bob Mackie, 87, American fashion designer and costumier (The Carol Burnett Show, Funny Lady, The Sonny & Cher Comedy Hour), seven-time Emmy winner, pneumonia.
- Jürg Marquard, 81, Swiss publisher and television personality.
- Peter Max, 88, German-American pop artist, complications from dementia.
- Ian Miller, 76, Australian footballer (Perth, Fitzroy, East Perth).
- K. D. Miller, 75, Canadian writer, cancer.
- Fabio Mosquera, 78, Colombian footballer (Deportivo Cali, Cúcuta Deportivo, national team).
- Victoria Okojie, 66, Nigerian librarian.
- Bernie Orenstein, 95, Canadian-born American television writer and producer (That Girl, Sanford and Son, What's Happening!!).
- Gianfranco Pieri, 89, Italian Hall of Fame basketball player (Trieste, Olimpia Milano, national team).
- Catherine Ringer, 68, French musician (Les Rita Mitsouko, Plaza Francia Orchestra) and songwriter ("Marcia Baila"), cancer.
- Joe Romm, 66, American climate researcher, writer and editor.
- Carl Sundin, 96, Swedish Olympic sprint canoeist (1956).
- Tara Singh Varma, 78, Dutch politician, MP (1994–2001).
- Yun Tong-hyon, North Korean general and politician, member of the Supreme People's Assembly (since 2019).

=== 15 ===
- Jodie Allen, 88, American journalist.
- Ahmed Ammi, 45, Moroccan-born Dutch footballer (ADO Den Haag, VVV-Venlo, NAC Breda), bowel cancer.
- Viktor Anushkevychus, 63, Ukrainian politician, mayor of Ivano-Frankivsk (2006–2015).
- René Aphing Kouassi, 78, Ivorian politician and magistrate.
- Rosalind Ashford, 83, American Hall of Fame singer (Martha and the Vandellas).
- Mike Beigel, 79, American electronics engineer.
- Tanella Boni, 71–72, Ivorian poet and novelist.
- Jim Bradshaw, 87, American football player (Pittsburgh Steelers).
- John Broughton, 79, New Zealand academic and playwright.
- Flora Brovina, 76, Kosovar-Albanian poet and politician, speaker of the Assembly (2014).
- Pierre Collin, 69, French painter, engraver and illustrator.
- Dakila Cua, 48, Filipino politician, governor (2007–2010, since 2019) and representative of Quirino (2010–2019).
- John Delaney, 84, English footballer (Wycombe Wanderers F.C., Bournemouth, national amateur team).
- Annie Dillard, 81, American writer (Tickets for a Prayer Wheel, Pilgrim at Tinker Creek, The Maytrees), Pulitzer Prize winner (1975).
- Andy Donato, 89, Canadian cartoonist (Toronto Sun, Toronto Telegram), heart attack.
- Ronnie Dove, 91, American pop and country singer ("Right or Wrong", "One Kiss for Old Times' Sake", "A Little Bit of Heaven").
- Pye Dubois, 77, Canadian lyricist ("Tom Sawyer", "Go for Soda") and poet.
- Karl Finch, 87, American football player (Los Angeles Rams).
- Griselda Gambaro, 98, Argentine playwright (The Camp, Information For Foreigners) and writer.
- Gerrit Graham, 77, American actor (Phantom of the Paradise, Used Cars, The Critic), lung disease.
- Bonnie Greer, 77, American-born British playwright (Marilyn and Ella), critic and novelist.
- Martin Gutzeit, 74, German clergyman and politician, Berlin commissioner of the Stasi Records Agency (1993–2017), member of the Volkskammer (1990) and Bundestag (1990).
- Patricio Guzmán, 85, Chilean film director (The Battle of Chile, Nostalgia for the Light, The Pearl Button), cardiorespiratory arrest.
- Junichi Kakizaki, 55, Japanese artist. (death announced on this date)
- David C. Kronick, 94, American politician, member of the New Jersey General Assembly (1988–1994).
- Laureano Leone, 98, Italian-born Canadian politician, Ontario MPP (1987–1990).
- Seppo Lindblom, 91, Finnish banker and politician, minister of trade and industry (1972, 1983–1987).
- Vitantonio Lovallo, 112, Italian supercentenarian.
- Georgios Makropoulos, 72, Greek chess player.
- Paulo César Martin, 62, Brazilian journalist and radio broadcaster (Folha de S.Paulo, TV Globo, Conrad Editora), pneumonia.
- Kevin Miller, 57, English football player (Exeter City, Watford, Crystal Palace) and coach.
- Alla Nani, 56, Indian politician, Andhra Pradesh MLA (2004–2014, since 2019) and deputy chief minister (2019–2022), heart attack.
- Peter Nieuwenhuis, 75, Dutch Olympic cyclist (1976).
- Jim Peters, 88, New Zealand politician, MP (2002–2005).
- Nebojša Radunović, 72, Serbian academic of obstetrics and gynecology (University of Belgrade Faculty of Medicine).
- Ralf Richter, 69, German actor (Das Boot, Bang Boom Bang, Fußball ist unser Leben), heart failure complicated by COPD.
- Rachid Sabbagh, Tunisian politician, minister of defence (2013–2014).
- Ben Saunders, 43, English-born Dutch singer (Follow That Dream).
- Jack Storey, 97, Australian footballer (Footscray, Port Melbourne).
- Sunny, 14, American dog, presidential pet (2013–2017).
- Amelinha Teles, 81, Brazilian journalist and political activist.
- Charles Trueheart, 75, American journalist (The Washington Post), cancer.
- Brian Wolfe, 45, American baseball player (Fukuoka SoftBank Hawks, Toronto Blue Jays, Saitama Seibu Lions), leukemia.
- Fredd Young, 64, American football player (Seattle Seahawks, Indianapolis Colts).

=== 16 ===
- Hans Andersson-Tvilling, 98, Swedish ice hockey (Djurgården) and football (Djurgården, national team) player, Olympic bronze medallist (1952).
- Martin Ashby, 82, English motorcycle speedway racer (Swindon Robins, Exeter Falcons, Great Britain national team).
- Domingo Buesa Conde, 73, Spanish historian, politician and Aragonese cultural advocate.
- Pierre Constant, 93, French actor and stage director.
- Jack Dale, 80, American Olympic ice hockey player (1968).
- Henrique, 49, Brazilian footballer (Vasco da Gama, Atlético Mineiro, Fluminense).
- Olu Jacobs, 84, Nigerian actor (Ashanti, Baby: Secret of the Lost Legend, Pirates).
- Tim Janus, 49, American competitive eater, cancer.
- Princess Lindiwe, Swazi royal and politician, MP (since 2018), cancer.
- Pilar Malla Escofet, 95, Spanish social worker, ombudswoman and teacher, member of the Parliament of Catalonia (1998–2003).
- Tsuneyuki Mitamura, 82, Japanese politician, mayor of Yame (2008–2024), member of the Fukuoka Prefectural Assembly (1991–2008).
- Ginger Molloy, 88, New Zealand motorcycle racer.
- Damodaran Nair, 81, Fijian politician, member of the House of Representatives (2004–2006). (death announced on this date)
- Jean Orizet, 89, French writer and literary critic.
- Randy Pedersen, 64, American bowler and sportscaster (ESPN, Fox, CBS Sports Network).
- Colin Powers, 70, British boxer, cancer.
- Dolores Sibonga, 95, American lawyer and politician, member of the Seattle City Council (1978, 1980–1992).
- Him Bahadur Shahi, 80, Nepali politician, Karnali MPA (since 2017), heart attack.
- Pietro Soddu, 97, Italian politician, deputy (1983–1994) and three-time president of Sardinia.
- Esterina Tartman, 68, Israeli politician, MK (2006–2009).
- Xaxá, 74, Brazilian footballer (Portuguesa, Portuguesa Santista, Juventus da Mooca).

=== 17 ===
- Alla Akhundova, 86, Azerbaijani poet, screenwriter (Shared Bread, Car, Violin and Blot the Dog, Along Unknown Paths) and translator.
- Anay Beltrán Reyes, 44, Mexican politician, deputy (since 2024).
- William Gummow, 83, Australian jurist, justice of the High Court (1995–2012).
- Chaudhry Muhammad Hanif, 62, Pakistani politician, Punjab MPA (2008–2018, since 2025), cardiac arrest.
- Jerry Thomas Howard, 90, American politician, member of the Missouri Senate (1990–2000).
- Ron Hurst, 95, Canadian ice hockey player (Toronto Maple Leafs, Rochester Americans, Toronto Marlboros).
- Blas Wilfredo Omar Jaime, 92, Argentine indigenous linguist, last native speaker of the Chaná language.
- Ludmila Javorová, 94, Czech Roman Catholic theologian.
- Bryan Kelly, 92, English composer, conductor and academic teacher (Royal College of Music, American University).
- Jon Kyl, 84, American politician, member of the U.S. Senate (1995–2013, 2018) and the House of Representatives (1987–1995), complications from dementia.
- Jeffery Lee, 49, American convicted murderer, execution by lethal injection.
- Alfredo Mantica, 83, Italian politician, senator (1987–1992, 1996–2013).
- Gary McCracken, 75, Canadian drummer (Max Webster) and singer.
- Glen Middlemiss, 70, Australian footballer (Geelong, St Kilda).
- Richard Morávek, 56, Czech businessman, developer and investor, complications from a head injury.
- E. M. Sudarsana Natchiappan, 78, Indian politician, MP (2004–2016).
- Barry T. Parker, 93, American politician, member of the New Jersey General Assembly (1966–1972) and Senate (1972–1982).
- Mac Percival, 86, American football player (Chicago Bears, Dallas Cowboys), colorectal cancer.
- Shao Qihui, 92, Chinese politician, governor of Heilongjiang (1989–1994).
- Duncan Sheik, 56, American singer-songwriter ("Barely Breathing") and composer (Spring Awakening), Tony winner (2007), heart failure.
- Wesley Shermantine, 60, American serial killer (Speed Freak Killers).
- Sway, 44, British rapper and songwriter ("Little Derek", "Still Speedin'", "Level Up").
- Michael Sweetney, 43, American basketball player (New York Knicks, Chicago Bulls, Shaanxi Kylins) and coach.
- Sergei Tchepikov, 59, Russian politician, biathlete and cross-country skier, Olympic champion (1988, 1994) and MP (since 2016), cancer.
- Gülsen Tuncer, 80, Turkish actress (Aşk-ı Memnu, O Hayat Benim, Mrs. Fazilet and Her Daughters), brain cancer.
- P. C. Vey, 70, American cartoonist (The New Yorker, Mad, National Lampoon).
- Oscar Wambrauw, 57, Indonesian academic.
- Kōichi Watanabe, 68, Japanese politician, MP (2012–2024, since 2026) and mayor of Iwamizawa (2002–2012).
- Patrick Zelnik, 79, French music publisher.

=== 18 ===
- Mohamed Salah Arfaoui, 70, Tunisian politician and civil engineer.
- Albert S. Axelrad, 87, American rabbi and author.
- Bryan Bishop, 48, American radio personality, brain cancer.
- Mike Burton, 79, American swimmer, Olympic champion (1968, 1972).
- Margaret Chant-Papandreou, 102, American-born Greek women's rights activist, political consort and writer.
- Stephanie Cole, 84, English actress (Open All Hours, Doc Martin, Coronation Street), complications from Alzheimer's disease.
- Alfred Tyrone Cooke, 86–87, Indian Air Force pilot.
- Grazia Daddario, 94, Italian actress (Soul Mate, Io che amo solo te, Tale of Tales).
- Hans Grodotzki, 90, German long-distance runner, double Olympic silver medalist (1960).
- Arthur B. Hancock III, 83, American Thoroughbred racehorse breeder, founder of Stone Farm, pancreatic cancer.
- Richard Harrison, 90, American actor (Secret Agent Fireball, 100.000 dollari per Ringo, The Invincible Gladiator).
- Frank Pieter Israel, 79, Dutch astronomer.
- Zimani Kadzamira, 85, Malawian academic, civil servant and diplomat.
- Sō Kuramoto, 91, Japanese screenwriter (Kunoichi Ninpō, Kita no Kuni kara, Umi e, See You), multiple organ failure.
- Arthur R. Kudart, 96, American politician, member of the Iowa Senate (1979–1983).
- John MacKenzie, 82, British historian.
- Karal Ann Marling, 82, American historian and writer.
- Miguel Mumbere Masaisai, 23, Congolese long-distance cyclist and activist, traffic collision.
- Peter Petrel, 86, German singer ("How Do You Do").
- Vissarion Stretovych, 72, Ukrainian Orthodox prelate.
- Bruce Swayze, 87, Canadian professional wrestler.
- Vector Lovers, 57, British electronic music producer, mesothelioma.
- Eugenio Zanetti, 79, Argentine production designer (Restoration, What Dreams May Come, Flatliners), Oscar winner (1996).

=== 19 ===
- Tyler Abell, 94, American lawyer, chief of protocol (1968–1969).
- Ernie Accorsi, 84, American football executive (Baltimore Colts, Cleveland Browns, New York Giants).
- Susy Aponte, 43, Peruvian journalist and politician, shot.
- Kai Dige Bach, 90, Danish politician, MP (1987–1998).
- Arthur Asa Berger, 93, American author and academic.
- Josef Buchmann, 96, German-Israeli real estate businessman, philanthropist (Buchmann-Mehta School of Music) and Holocaust survivor.
- Willie Callaghan, 83, Scottish footballer (Dunfermline Athletic, Berwick Rangers, Cowdenbeath).
- Beverly Dahlen, 91, American poet.
- Richard Giragosian, 61, Armenian-American academic, complications from a cerebral hemorrhage.
- Elliot Graham, 50, American film editor (Milk, Captain Marvel, No Time to Die), BAFTA winner (2022), suicide by gunshot.
- Peter Hermann, 74, German football player (Alemannia Aachen, Bayer Leverkusen) and manager, complications from amyotrophic lateral sclerosis.
- Sophia Horner-Sam, 77, Ghanaian diplomat and politician.
- Carolyn J. B. Howard, 87, American politician, member of the Maryland House of Delegates (1988–1990, 1991–2019).
- Abraham Julios, 81, Indian Syro-Malankaran Catholic hierarch, bishop of Muvattupuzha (2008–2019).
- Mykola Karpyuk, 62, Ukrainian far-right militant (UNA-UNSO), drone strike.
- Frans Kgomo, 75, South African jurist, judge of the high court (2008–2022).
- Jacques Leveugle, 79, French teacher, pedophile and sexual predator.
- Paul Lloyd, 57, English boxer.
- Wes MacAleer, 82, Canadian politician, Prince Edward Island MLA (1996–2007).
- Sandro Mazzola, 83, Italian football player (Inter Milan, national team) and commentator (Rai Sport).
- Nico Perrone, 91, Italian journalist.
- Barbara Perry, 81, American Olympic volleyball player.
- Tim Read, 64, Australian politician, Victorian MLA (since 2018), cancer.
- Chanmyay Sayadaw, 98, Burmese Theravada Buddhist monk, pneumonia.
- Jeff Scott, 72, American baseball writer and journalist, pulmonary fibrosis.
- Danny Setiawan, 81, Indonesian politician, governor of West Java (2003–2008).
- Graciela Taquini, 85, Argentine artist, curator and teacher.
- Sir Nathaniel Waena, 80, Solomon Islands politician, MP (1984–2004) and governor-general (2004–2009).
- Keith Wakefield, 78, English politician, leader of Leeds City Council (2003–2004, 2010–2015).
- James Walker, 38, English-born Antiguan and Barbudan footballer (Southend United, East Thurrock United, Antigua and Barbuda national team).

=== 20 ===
- Sid Ahmed Agoumi, 85, Algerian actor (Z, Layla, My Reason, Black Really Suits You).
- Shirley Banfield, 88, Australian cricketer (Victoria, national team).
- Cameron Bell, 87, New Zealand rugby league coach (Auckland, Carlisle, New Zealand Māori).
- Bruce Bergey, 80, American football player (Kansas City Chiefs, Houston Oilers, Toronto Argonauts).
- André Bon, 80, French composer.
- Karim Bujang, 73, Malaysian politician, Sabah State MLA (1990–2013).
- Margit Carlqvist, 94, Swedish actress (Smiles of a Summer Night).
- Franco Columbo, 73, Mexican professional wrestler.
- Davide Di Lernia, 47, Italian filmmaker, traffic collision.
- Michael James Gaffey, 80, American planetary scientist.
- Presley Gerber, 27, American model.
- Chad Gilbert, 45, American guitarist (New Found Glory), songwriter ("Hit or Miss", "All Downhill from Here") and record producer, pheochromocytoma.
- Kenneth Hay, 101, British World War II veteran.
- Ibrahim Idris, 77, Nigerian politician, governor of Kogi State (2003–2012).
- Gérard Jouault, 74, French volleyball coach (women's national team).
- Jacko McDonagh, 64, Irish footballer (Bohemians, Shamrock Rovers, national team).
- Milton Viera, 80, Uruguayan footballer (Nacional, Olympiacos, national team).
- G. Vijayaraghavan, 84, Indian cardiologist.

=== 21 ===
- Ahmed bin Rashid Al Maktoum, 76, Emirati public official.
- Carlos Alonso, 97, Argentine painter, draftsman and printmaker.
- Angry Anderson, 79, Australian Hall of Fame musician (Rose Tattoo), songwriter ("Suddenly") and actor (Mad Max Beyond Thunderdome).
- Morris Ballen, 88, American media manufacturer and distributor.
- Sergio Carpanesi, 90, Italian football player (Roma, Fiorentina) and manager (Spezia).
- Alyette Debray-Mauduy, 57, French journalist (Le Figaro), traffic collision.
- Terry Denton, 76, Australian writer (Gasp!) and illustrator (The 13-Storey Treehouse, The Cat on the Mat Is Flat).
- Jean-Paul Desprat, 79, French writer and historian.
- Mark Doyle, 67, British journalist (BBC News).
- Jochen Fahrenberg, 89, German psychologist.
- Jun Gato, 66, Filipino politician, representative (since 2019), heart attack.
- Dadeus Grings, 90, Brazilian Roman Catholic prelate, bishop of São João da Boa Vista (1991–2000) and archbishop of Porto Alegre (2000–2013), stroke.
- Terry Harryman, 87, British rally co-driver.
- Mike Hasselbach, 57, South African Olympic rower (1996, 2000).
- Josef Kalbáč, 86, Czech agronomist and politician, senator (2003–2008).
- Yahya Lampong, 86, Malaysian politician, MP (1982–1986) and Sabah State MLA (1985–1986).
- Barry Marder, 76, American comedian and screenwriter (Bee Movie, Unfrosted, Night Stand with Dick Dietrick).
- Bob Masse, 81, Canadian artist.
- Mithu Mukherjee, 71, Indian actress (Marjina Abdulla, Safed Jhooth, Dillagi), cancer.
- Burhan Özfatura, 83, Turkish politician, mayor of İzmir (1984–1989, 1994–1999), cardiac arrest.
- Jorge Palma, 76, Portuguese singer and songwriter, cardiac arrest.
- JJ Pionke, 47–48, American librarian and disability advocate.
- Konstantin Polezhayev, 54, Russian politician, mayor of Belgorod (2015–2019) and deputy governor of Belgorod Oblast (2019–2023), drone strike.
- Mousa Shubairi Zanjani, 98, Iranian Twelver Shia marja, stomach bleeding.
- Rick Sollo, 59, Brazilian singer-songwriter (Rick & Renner) and sertanejo music producer, helicopter crash.
- Chris Spatola, 47, American college basketball player (Army Black Knights) and analyst.
- Phil Spence, 72, American college basketball player (NC State Wolfpack) and coach (North Carolina Central Eagles).
- Stanisław Szelc, 83, Polish satirist and actor.
- Alan Vaughan Williams, 96, British playwright and theatre director.

=== 22 ===
- James Becket, 89, American filmmaker and human rights lawyer.
- Louise Botting, 87, British broadcaster (Money Box) and businesswoman.
- Bernard Brizay, 85, French historian and academic.
- Joshua Cassara, 46, American comic book artist (X-Force, Falcon, New Avengers), heart failure.
- Don Cooper, 70, American baseball player (Minnesota Twins, New York Yankees) and coach (Chicago White Sox).
- Arnaud Denis, 43, French actor (Yves Saint Laurent, Elles et Moi, Candice Renoir) and stage director, euthanasia.
- Mike Edwards, 74, American baseball player (Oakland A's, Pittsburgh Pirates).
- George N. Gillett Jr., 87, American sport executive, chairman of Liverpool F.C. (2007–2010), complications from Alzheimer's disease.
- Harry Haines, 87, American judge.
- David Hollister, 84, American politician, member of the Michigan House of Representatives (1975–1993) and mayor of Lansing (1994–2003).
- Hurricane Fly, 22, Irish Thoroughbred racehorse.
- Riccardo Innocenti, 83, Italian footballer (Lecco, Perugia, Milan).
- Ivan Khlanta, 85, Ukrainian folklorist.
- Sjoerd Kuyper, 74, Dutch poet and author (Het Zakmes).
- Kenneth Lane, 84, American physicist.
- Lucien Lazare, 101, French-Israeli history teacher and resistance fighter.
- Mario-Philippe Losembe, 92, Congolese politician, minister for foreign affairs (1970–1971, 1971–1972).
- Alojzy Lysko, 84, Polish writer and politician, member of the Sejm (2005–2007).
- Sir John Mace, 94, New Zealand army officer, chief of the General Staff (1984–1987) and of the Defence Staff (1987–1991).
- Zeke Moore, 82, American football player (Houston Oilers).
- Tsuneko Okazaki, 93, Japanese molecular biologist, gastrointestinal bleeding.
- Peter Prince, 84, British novelist.
- Rodolphe, 78, French comic book writer, cardiac arrest.
- Daniel Singer, 66, American actor and playwright (The Complete Works of William Shakespeare (Abridged)), complications following surgery.
- Zuenir Ventura, 95, Brazilian journalist (O Globo, Época) and writer.
- Donald Weder, 79, American inventor and businessman.

=== 23 ===
- Manuel Boix, 83, Spanish painter and sculptor.
- Dee Brock, 96, American cheerleading director (Dallas Cowboys Cheerleaders).
- Alfonsas Bukontas, 85, Lithuanian poet, translator and publicist.
- Paul Butler, Northern Irish politician, MLA (2007–2011).
- Garnet Coleman, 65, American politician, member of the Texas House of Representatives (1991–2022).
- John Davies, 99, English Anglican clergyman, bishop of Shrewsbury (1987–1994).
- Vyacheslav Dolgov, 89, Russian diplomat and academic.
- First Dude, 19, American Thoroughbred racehorse.
- Maurice de Germiny, 86, French Roman Catholic prelate, bishop of Blois (1997–2014).
- Harriet Hancock, 89, American LGBT rights activist.
- Cyril Hilsum, 101, British physicist and academic.
- Philippe Huet, 84, French journalist and novelist.
- Jackie Jackson, 79, Jamaican bass player (Toots and the Maytals).
- Soorya Krishnamoorthy, 78, Indian artist and philanthropist, founder of Soorya Festival.
- Barry Luokkala, 72, American physicist.
- Don McKenzie, 87, Australian footballer (Essendon, Victoria).
- Bob Pettit, 93, American Hall of Fame basketball player (Milwaukee / St. Louis Hawks).
- Edward Rogalski, 84, American academic administrator, president of St. Ambrose University (1987–2007).
- Sapa'u Lolesio, 99, Samoan politician, MP (1988–1991).
- Suresh Raj Sharma, 86, Nepali educationist, vice chancellor of Kathmandu University (1991–2012).
- Leon Sirois, 91, American racing driver.
- Sergey Sosedov, 58, Russian journalist and music critic, fall.
- Savithri Sreedharan, 85, Indian actress (Sudani from Nigeria, Virus, Dakini).
- Lawrence Tanter, 76, American public address announcer (Los Angeles Lakers).

=== 24 ===
- Yehuda Atlas, 89, Israeli writer, poet and translator.
- John Baer, 79, American journalist (Philadelphia Daily News).
- Allister Bain, 94, Grenadian-born British actor (Doctor Who, The Bill, Made in Britain), playwright and screenwriter.
- Roy Belliveau, 96, American basketball player (Scranton Miners) and coach.
- Mohammed Benchicou, 74, Algerian director and publisher.
- Bernie Brennan, 98, Canadian football player (Ottawa Rough Riders).
- Bill Cahill, 75, American football player (Buffalo Bills).
- Arthur Cantrill, 88, Australian filmmaker.
- Ricardo Centellas, 63, Bolivian Roman Catholic prelate, auxiliary bishop (2005–2009) and bishop (2009–2020) of Potosí and archbishop of Sucre (since 2020).
- Bachtiar Chamsyah, 80, Indonesian politician.
- Jacob Goldwasser, 76, Israeli film director (Beyond the Sea, Laces).
- Akhtar Hossain, 80, Bangladeshi children's writer.
- Bert Johnson, 87, Australian footballer (West Adelaide, North Melbourne).
- Mushtaq Khan, 75, Indian actor (Hum Hain Rahi Pyar Ke, Jodi No.1, Welcome), cancer.
- L. Krishnan, 103, Indian-born Malaysian film director and screenwriter (Bakti).
- Moses Matovu, 77, Ugandan musician (Afrigo Band), beaten.
- John J. McCusker, 87, American economist.
- Richard Mulcahey, 91, American politician, member of the Illinois House of Representatives (1975–1993).
- Roberto Müller, 89, Brazilian singer.
- Peter Nogly, 79, German football player (Hamburger SV, West Germany national team) and manager (Eintracht Norderstedt).
- Milan Panić, 96, Serbian pharmaceutical industry executive and politician, founder of ICN Pharmaceuticals, prime minister (1992–1993) and minister of defence of FR Yugoslavia (1992–1993).
- Piak Poster, 93, Thai filmmaker, film poster artist and actor (The Billionaire).
- Reinaldo Sánchez, 81, Chilean businessman and football administrator (ANFP, Santiago Wanderers).
- Isao Takeuchi, 74, Japanese politician, member of the House of Councillors (2021–2022), mayor of Tottori (2002–2014), cerebral hemorrhage.
- Moses Tay, 88, Singaporean Anglican clergyman, bishop of Singapore (1982–2000).
- Chotelal Verma, 73, Indian politician, Uttar Pradesh MLA (1993–1995, 2002–2007, 2012–2017).
- Marina Vlady, 88, French actress (The Conjugal Bed, Two or Three Things I Know About Her, Chimes at Midnight).
- J. Richard Wuest, 88, American pharmacist.
- You Benchang, 93, Chinese actor (Ji Gong, The Butcher, the Chef and the Swordsman, The University Days of a Dog).

=== 25 ===
- Carmen Aldunate, 86, Chilean painter.
- Chaudhary Muhammad Ashraf, 90, Pakistani politician, MNA (2013–2023).
- Georges Taï Benson, 80, Ivorian television presenter.
- Remo Calzona, 87, Italian civil engineer.
- Antonio Canal, 90, Spanish actor (Cuéntame cómo pasó).
- Ram Govind Chaudhary, 73, Indian politician, Uttar Pradesh MLA (1977–1992, 2002–2007, 2012–2022).
- Javier Delgado Barrio, 93, Spanish judge, president of the Supreme Court and the CGPJ (1996–2001).
- Leo Gaje, 88, Filipino martial artist.
- Bill Giles, 92, American baseball executive (Philadelphia Phillies).
- Oscar González Oro, 74, Argentine journalist (Los unos y los otros) and radio host.
- André Guy, 85, French footballer (Saint-Étienne, Lyon, national team).
- Mayer Hillman, 94, British architect, environmentalist and town planner.
- Norm Kimball, 96, Canadian Hall of Fame football executive (Edmonton Eskimos, Montreal Alouettes).
- Reg Knezacek, 80, Canadian politician.
- Aleksei Kozlov, 90, Russian saxophonist.
- Bruno Kramm, 58, German musician (Das Ich).
- Ryszard Lenczewski, 78, Polish cinematographer (Ida, My Summer of Love, Margaret).
- Liu Huan, 63, Chinese singer ("You and Me") and songwriter.
- Jeoff Long, 84, American baseball player (St. Louis Cardinals, Chicago White Sox).
- Soulis Markopoulos, 77, Greek basketball player and coach (PAOK Thessaloniki, Aris Thessaloniki, Makedonikos).
- David Marsden, 85, Canadian radio broadcaster, complications from a fall.
- Peter May, 74, Scottish screenwriter (Take the High Road) and novelist (The Blackhouse).
- Ahmad Nategh Nouri, 89, Iranian politician and sport administrator.
- Zosima Ostapenko, 76, Russian Orthodox prelate.
- Karel Eduard Paar, 92, Czech jurist.
- Ralph Sonnenberg, 92, Dutch window coverings manufacturer (Hunter Douglas).
- Antero Sotamaa, 86, Finnish Olympic sailor.
- Roger Tarpy, 84, American psychologist.
- Sidya Touré, 81, Guinean politician, prime minister (1996–1999).
- Nikolay Velikdan, 70, Russian politician, speaker of the Duma of Stavropol Krai (since 2021).
- Rini Wagtmans, 79, Dutch road bicycle racer.
- Saburō Yamashita, 96, Japanese politician and anti-nuclear activist, mayor of Hatsukaichi (1991–2007).

=== 26 ===
- Bob Agee, 87, American academic administrator, president of Oklahoma Baptist University (1982–1998).
- Philippa Baker, 93, Australian actress (Number 96, Young Einstein, Annie's Coming Out).
- Peter Barrett, 86, New Zealand geologist.
- Janine Boissard, 93, French author.
- Tony Currie, 74, Scottish broadcaster (Radio Clyde), tonsil cancer.
- Pierre Ferrazzi, 80, French football player (Grenoble, France amateurs) and manager (Valence).
- Ronnie Golden, 78, British singer (The Fabulous Poodles) and comedian, heart attack.
- Pedro Fedalto, 100, Brazilian Roman Catholic prelate, auxiliary bishop (1966–1970) and archbishop (1970–2004) of Curitiba.
- David Millage, 73, American politician, member of the Iowa House of Representatives (1991–2003).
- Bruno Musarò, 78, Italian Roman Catholic prelate, apostolic nuncio to Panama (1994–1999), Guatemala (2004–2009) and Costa Rica (2019–2023).
- Connie Osterman, 90, Canadian politician.
- Maksim Ovodenko, 96, Russian metallurgist and aeronautical scientist, member of the Russian Academy of Engineering.
- David Ring, 72, American evangelist.
- James H. Rosenfield, 97, American television executive (CBS).
- Angela Stribling, 58, American television and radio host (BET, WJZ-TV), and singer, brain cancer.
- Guruh Sukarnoputra, 73, Indonesian politician and artist, MP (1999–2024).
- Tony Tashnick, 88, American swimmer.
- Hirokazu Ueyonabaru, 55, Japanese athlete, Paralympic silver medallist (2008), injuries sustained in a traffic collision.
- Asami Yaguchi, 47, Japanese voice actress (Tamagotchi!, Doraemon, Net Ghost PiPoPa), heart failure.
- Tokushin Yamauchi, 91, Japanese politician, MP (2007–2013) and mayor of Yomitan (1974–1998).
- Ahmed El-Zend, 80, Egyptian jurist, minister of justice (2015–2016).

=== 27 ===
- Frank Busch, 75, American swimming coach, heart attack.
- Johan Buttedahl, 90, Norwegian politician, MP (1981–1989).
- Bob Davenport, 94, English traditional folk singer.
- Ludwig Gössing, 88, German equestrian, Olympic bronze medallist (1972).
- Dennis Haskins, 75, American actor (Saved by the Bell, Clemency, Max Keeble's Big Move), complications from Parkinson's disease.
- Juraj Hraško, 95, Slovak politician and scientist, minister of environment (1994) and MNC (1992–1994).
- John Dixon Hunt, 90, English historian.
- Mighty Sparrow, 91, Grenadian-born Trinidadian calypso musician.
- César Ortiz-Echagüe, 99, Spanish architect and Roman Catholic priest.
- Pac, 40, English professional wrestler (AEW, WWE, Dragongate), bronchial asthma.
- Pierre Plante, 75, Canadian ice hockey player (St. Louis Blues, Philadelphia Flyers, Quebec Nordiques).
- Robert Rivas, 80, Trinidadian Roman Catholic prelate, bishop of Kingstown (1989–2007) and archbishop of Castries (2008–2022).
- David Sargent, 95, American lawyer and academic administrator.
- Manuel Seal, 66, American record producer and songwriter ("Just Kickin' It", "My Boo", "We Belong Together"), Grammy winner (2006).
- Irvin Servold, 93, Canadian Olympic skier (1956, 1960).
- Howard H. Stevenson, 85, American business theorist.
- Ken Taylor, 91, English cricketer (Yorkshire, national team) and footballer (Huddersfield Town), complications from dementia.
- Bernard Verley, 86, French actor (Something Fishy, By the Grace of God) and film producer (Pacific Palisades).
- Steven T. Walther, 83, American attorney.

=== 28 ===
- Naoki Bandō, 68, Japanese voice actor (Oishinbo, Shadow of the Colossus, Naruto).
- Bethany Barratt, 54, American political scientist and author.
- Ali Bendayan, 83, Moroccan footballer (Raja, Wydad, national team).
- Pat Clohessy, 93, Australian long-distance runner and coach.
- Kathy Cornelius, 93, American golfer.
- Jacek Furdyna, 93, Polish-American physicist.
- Damien Girard, 24, French road racing cyclist.
- Teodoro Gómez, 63, Honduran Roman Catholic prelate, auxiliary bishop of Tegucigalpa (2020–2023) and bishop of Choluteca (since 2023).
- John Grover, 87, British film editor (For Your Eyes Only, Labyrinth, Lifeforce).
- Siti Hasmah, 100, Malaysian civil servant, spouse of the prime minister (1981–2003, 2018–2020) and chancellor of Multimedia University (1997–2012), heart failure.
- Gordon Johncock, 90, American racing driver, Indianapolis 500 winner (1973, 1982).
- Jean-François Le Nail, 80, French archivist and historian.
- Manfred Letzerich, 84, German Olympic long-distance runner (1964, 1968, 1972).
- Lieutenant Stitchie, 60, Jamaican reggae musician and DJ.
- Jimmy Lim, 82, Malaysian architect (Salinger House).
- Dottie Martin, 89, American educator, first lady of North Carolina (1975–1983).
- Gaëtan Mourgue d'Algue, 87, French golfer.
- Anne Claire Poirier, 94, Canadian film director (Before the Time Comes, A Scream from Silence, Beyond Forty).
- Greg Powers, 80, American professional golfer.
- Seela Sella, 89, Finnish actress (Sibelius, Kalteva torni), cancer.
- Yevgeny Sverdlov, 87, Russian biochemist, member of the Russian Academy of Sciences.
- Armando Vega, 90, American Olympic gymnast (1956) and coach.
- Pietro Veglio, 81–82, Swiss economist.
- Michael Wynn-Jones, 85, Welsh writer, editor and publisher.
- Avaz Zeynalli, 56, Azerbaijani investigative journalist, colon cancer.
- Andrea Zlatar Violić, 65, Croatian politician, minister of culture (2011–2015).

=== 29 ===
- Jalal Abdul-Rahman, 82, Iraqi footballer (Al-Zawraa, Al-Naqil, national team).
- Tay Baker, 99, American college basketball coach (Cincinnati Bearcats, Xavier Musketeers).
- Donald Bergagård, 90, Swedish singer, accordionist and evangelist.
- Kalki Bhagawan, 77, Indian spiritual leader.
- Gilbert Bigio, 91, Haitian conglomerate industry executive, founder of GB Group.
- Joe Callanan, 77, Irish politician, TD (2002–2007).
- Majella Cullinane, 50, Irish-born New Zealand author.
- Náfer Durán, 93, Colombian accordionist and songwriter.
- Şükrü Ersoy, 95, Turkish footballer (Vefa S.K., Fenerbahçe, national team).
- Julián García Vargas, 80, Spanish politician, minister of health (1986–1991) and defence (1991–1995).
- Rafil Garifullin, 82, Russian politician, member of the State Assembly of the Republic of Bashkortostan (1995–2003).
- Phil Gifford, 79, New Zealand sportswriter (Sunday Star-Times) and broadcaster (Radio Sport).
- Frank Grønlund, 73, Norwegian footballer (Lillestrøm, national team), vascular dementia.
- Ionel Haiduc, 89, Romanian chemist, president of the Romanian Academy (2006–2014).
- John E. Hoiles, 88, Australian footballer (Footscray).
- Colette Sénami Agossou Houeto, 87, Beninese educator, feminist poet and politician.
- Stephen Kerley, 73, Australian footballer (Melbourne).
- Janice Laking, 96, Canadian politician, mayor of Barrie (1988–2000).
- Conrad Lant, 63, English musician (Venom) and songwriter ("In League with Satan", "Bloodlust").
- Veaceslav Madan, 77, Moldovan film director, politician and diplomat, minister of culture (2002–2005).
- Vijai Singh Mankotia, 87, Indian politician, Himachal Pradesh MLA (1982–1998, 2003–2007).
- Courtney Meppen-Walters, 32, English footballer (Glossop North End, Chorley, Bury).
- Jean-Jacques Nyenimigabo, 77, Burundian politician.
- Juan Carlos Pagotto, 74, Argentine lawyer and politician, senator (since 2023), member of the Legislature of La Rioja (1993–1997), heart attack.
- Umberto Pizzi, 88, Italian photojournalist.
- Amos Rapoport, 97, Polish-American architect.
- Jan Jarboe Russell, 75, American journalist (Texas Monthly) and writer.
- Shi Wenbo, 75–76, Chinese hygiene products industry executive, co-founder of Hengan International.
- Otto Sirgo, 79, Cuban actor (I Do ... Knot, Un gancho al corazón, Por ella soy Eva).
- Gonzalo Suárez, 92, Spanish film director (Rowing with the Wind, Epilogue, The Detective and Death).
- Kongsak Vantana, 81, Thai politician and air force officer, minister of interior (2005–2006), commander-in-chief of the Royal Thai Air Force (2002–2005).
- George Waft, 89, Manx politician, Isle of Man MLC (1994–2010).

=== 30 ===
- Eddie Belmonte, 83, Puerto Rican jockey.
- Jérôme Bignon, 77, French politician, deputy (1993–1997, 2002–2012), senator (2014–2020).
- John Bröcheler, 81, Dutch operatic baritone (Dutch National Opera).
- Josef Buchner, 84, Austrian politician, mayor of Steyregg (1997–2012).
- Kent Carter, 87, American jazz bassist.
- Wicknell Chivayo, 43, Zimbabwean energy industry executive, helicopter crash.
- Paulien Cornelisse, 50, Dutch writer and television presenter (De slimste mens), cancer.
- Andy Fenton, 73, Irish hurler (Galway, Kiltormer).
- Dominique Foata, 91, French mathematician.
- Scott Froschauer, 57, American artist, sculptor (Burning Man), and key grip (The Lost World: Jurassic Park).
- Jerry Golod, 87, American television producer (Tales from the Darkside), cancer.
- Margaret Hamilton, 90, American computer scientist and software engineer.
- Athanasios Iliadis, 74, Greek Olympic boxer (1976). (death announced on this date)
- Jorge Kahwagi, 58, Mexican boxer and politician, deputy (2003–2006, 2009–2012).
- Andrea Kdolsky, 63, Austrian politician, minister of health (2007–2008), cancer.
- Robert Kururangi, 69, New Zealand rugby union player (Counties, national team).
- Paul N. Lazarus III, 88, American film producer (Westworld, Futureworld, Capricorn One).
- Peppino Mazzullo, 100, Italian actor and voice actor (Topo Gigio).
- Keith B. McMullin, 85, American Latter-Day Saint operating executive, CEO of Deseret Management Corporation (2012–2023).
- Gabino Palomares, 76, Mexican singer-songwriter and political activist.
- Dame Esther Rantzen, 86, English journalist, television presenter (That's Life!) and philanthropist (Childline, The Silver Line), lung cancer.
- Ramón Luis Rivera, 97, Puerto Rican politician, mayor of Bayamón (1977–2001) and member of the House of Representatives (1973–1977).
- Dave Rosello, 76, Puerto Rican baseball player (Chicago Cubs, Cleveland Indians).
- Adrian Rurawhe, 65, New Zealand politician, member (2014–2026), deputy speaker (2020–2022), and speaker (2022–2023) of the House of Representatives.
- Pat Saiki, 96, American politician, member of the U.S. House of Representatives (1987–1991) and administrator of the Small Business Administration (1991–1993).
- Steve Selvin, 85, American statistician.
- Gabriel Serville, 67, French politician, deputy (2012–2021), member (2010–2012) and president (since 2021) of the Assembly of French Guiana, cancer.
- Uriel Simon, 97, Israeli biblical scholar.
- Michael Wright, 85, English road bicycle racer.
