= Pierre Collin =

Pierre Collin may refer to:

- Pierre Collin (actor) (1938–2023), Canadian actor
- Pierre Collin (artist) (1958–2026), French painter

== See also ==
- Pierre Colin
