= Veglio (surname) =

Veglio is an Italian surname. Notable people with the surname include:

- Antonio Maria Vegliò (born 1938), Italian Cardinal of the Roman Catholic Church
- Bruno Veglio (born 1998), Uruguayan footballer
- Carlos Veglio, (born 1946), former Argentine football striker
- Filippo Veglio (born 1974), former professional tennis player from Switzerland
- Pietro Veglio (born 1944), Swiss economist

== See also ==
- Veglio
