= List of mayors of Sierre =

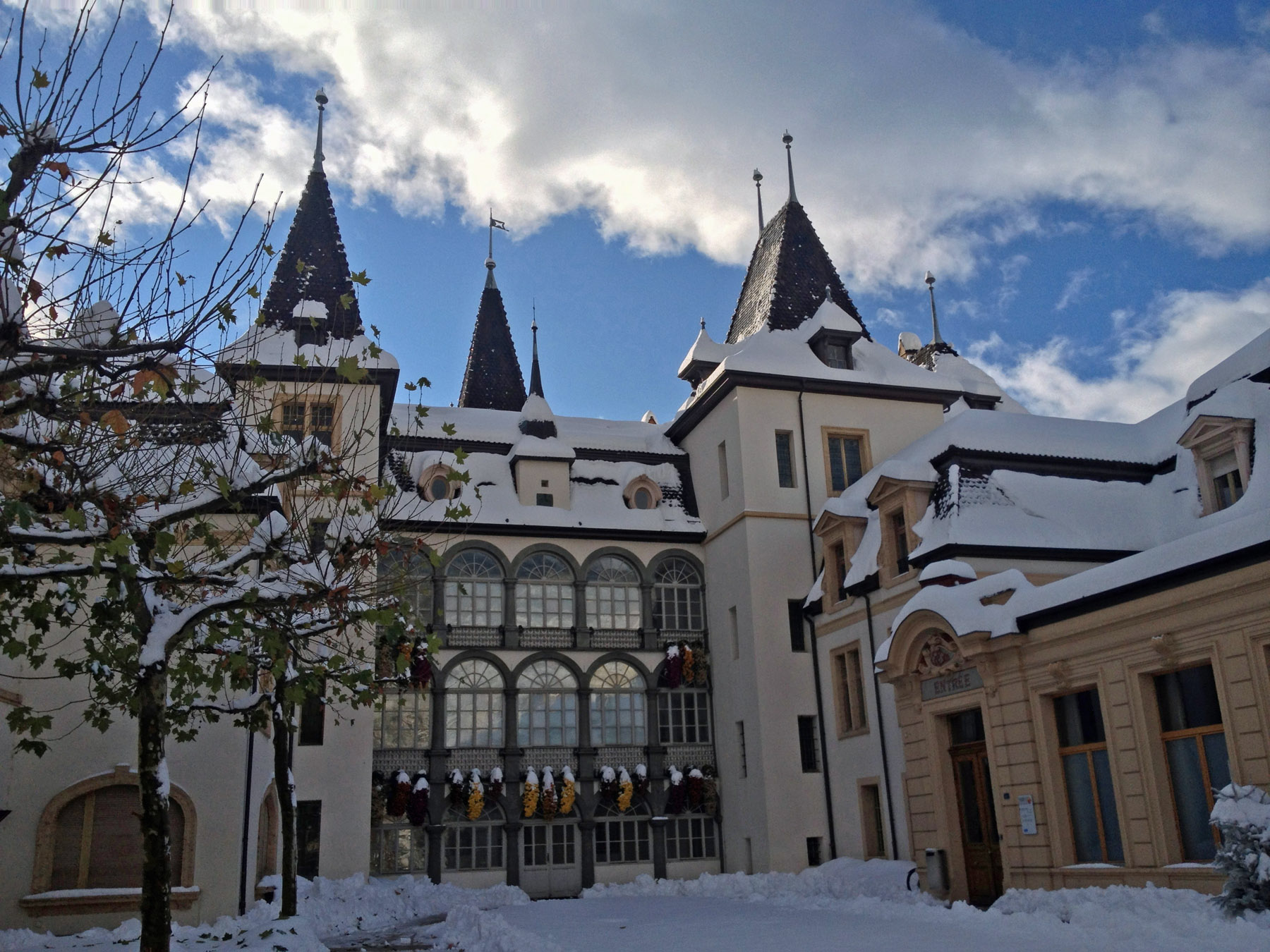
Hôtel-de-Ville, Sierre

Flag of Sierre

Coat of arms of Sierre

This is a list of mayors of Sierre in canton of Valais, Switzerland. The city of Sierre is governed by a nine-member executive (conseil municipal) chaired by the mayor (Président).

Mayor (Président du conseil municipal) of Sierre
Term	Mayor	Lifespan	Party	Notes
1897–1908	César de Sépibus	(1845–1908)		
1909–1912	Michel Zufferey	(1850–1917)		
1913–1916	Pierre-Marie Zwissig	(1857–1939)	FDP/PRD	
1917 – September 1939	Maurice Bonvin	(1876–1939)	FDP/PRD	
October 1939 – May 1945	Marcel Gard	(1892–1979)	FDP/PRD	
May 1945 - 1956	Elie Zwissig	(1891–1982)	FDP/PRD	
1957 – December 1970	Maurice Salzmann	(1906–1970)	CVP/PDC	
February 1971 – 1980	Pierre de Chastonay	(born 1931)	CVP/PDC	
1981–1988	Victor Berclaz		FDP/PRD	
1989 – March 1992	Serge Sierro	(born 1949)	FDP/PRD	
March 1992 – 2000	Charles-Albert Antille	(born 1944)	FDP/PRD	
2001–2008	Manfred Stucky		CVP/PDC	
2009 – 2016	François Genoud	(born 1952)	FDP/PRD	
2017 – present	Pierre Berthod	(born 1981)	CVP/PDC	
