= Rafil Garifullin =

Russian politician (1944–2026)

- Рафиль Гарифуллин

Deputy Prime Minister of the Republic of Bashkortostan
- In office 1997–2002

Member of the State Assembly of the Republic of Bashkortostan
- In office 21 March 1995 – 6 March 2003

Personal details
- Born: 17 August 1944 Bekeshevo, Baymaksky District, Bashkir ASSR, Russian SFSR, USSR
- Died: 29 September 2026 (aged 82) Ufa, Bashkortostan, Russia
- Education: Ural State University of Economics
- Profession: Politician

Rafil Khatmullovich Garifullin (Russian: Рафиль Хатмуллович Гарифуллин; 17 August 1944 – 29 September 2026) was a Russian politician who was a member of the State Assembly of the Republic of Bashkortostan from 1995 to 2003.

Garifullin died in Ufa on 29 September 2026, at the age of 82.
