= Alexey Vishnevetsky =

Russian journalist (1965/1966–2026)

Alexey Konstantinovich Vishnevetsky (Russian: Алексей Константинович Вишневецкий; 1965 or 1966 – c. 4 September 2026) was a Russian journalist. He began his career at Moskovskaya Pravda. Vishnevetsky was the executive secretary of the Parlamentskaya Gazeta from 2009 to 2012, and the deputy chairman of the Russian Union of Journalists from 2017 to his death in 2026, at age 60. He became an Honored Journalist of the Russian Federation in 2026. On 4 September 2026, it was announced that Vishnevetsky had died at the age of 60.
