= Jean Galard =

French organist (1949–2026)

- Born: 19 February 1949; Vincennes, France
- Died: 9 September 2026 (aged 77); Paris, France
- Education: Conservatoire de Paris
- Occupation: Organist

Jean Galard (French: [ʒˈɑ̃ ɡalˈaʁ]; 19 February 1949 – 9 September 2026) was a French organist.

A graduate of the Conservatoire de Paris, he was awarded the 1979 Prix Maurice Duruflé by the Amis de l'orgue. He spent his career as the organist for the Beauvais Cathedral and the Church of Saint-Médard.

Galard died in Paris on 9 September 2026, at the age of 77.
