= Khrist Kopetzky =

French rugby union player (1982–2026)

- Born: 5 February 1982 Saintes, France
- Died: 1 September 2026 (aged 44) Hong Kong
- Height: 1.70 m (5 ft 7 in)
- Weight: 75 kg (165 lb)

Rugby union career
- Position(s): Scrum-half, fly-half, fullback, wing
Senior career
| Years | Team | Apps | (Points) |
| 2003–2006 | Stade Bordelais | 24 | (245) |
| 2006–2007 | Gaillac | 24 | (71) |
| 2007–2010 | Stado Tarbes Pyrénées Rugby | 54 | (246) |
| 2010–2011 | Blagnac Rugby | 27 | (247) |
| 2011–2012 | Coventry R.F.C. | 7 | (11) |
| 2012–2013 | USA Limoges | 18 | (238) |
| 2013–2018 | Valley RFC | ? | (?) |
National sevens team
| Years | Team | | Comps |
| 2006–2007 | France | | 24 |

Khrist Kopetzky (French: [kʁˈist kopɛtskˈi]; 5 February 1982 – 1 September 2026) was a French rugby union player who played at multiple positions.

Kopetzky spent most of his career in Fédérale 1 and appeared in 24 matches for the France national rugby sevens team.

Kopetzky died in Hong Kong on 1 September 2026, at the age of 44.
