= Martin Gutzeit =

German clergyman and politician (1952–2026)

Martin Gutzeit (30 April 1952 – 15 September 2026) was a German clergyman and politician from Social Democratic Party of Germany. He was a member of the Volkskammer in 1990 and Bundestag in 1990. Gutzeit was born in Cottbus on 30 April 1952. He was the Berlin commissioner of the Stasi Records Agency from 1993 to 2017. Gutzeit died on 15 September 2026, at the age of 74.
