= Silvio Meli =

Maltese judge (1954–2026)

Silvio Meli (1954 – 7 September 2026) was a Maltese judge.

A graduate of the University of Malta, Meli worked in the Attorney General's Office and authored several publications about civil law.

He served as a magistrate from 1990 to 2001, and then as a judge until retirement in April 2019.

He later served as founding president of the Commission for Fair Trading and the Commission Against Drug and Alcohol Abuse. and lectured at the University of Malta's Faculty of Law.

Judge Meli was married with three children.

He died on 7 September 2026, at the age of 72.

== See also ==
- Judiciary of Malta
