= Artur Heras =

Spanish painter (1945–2026)

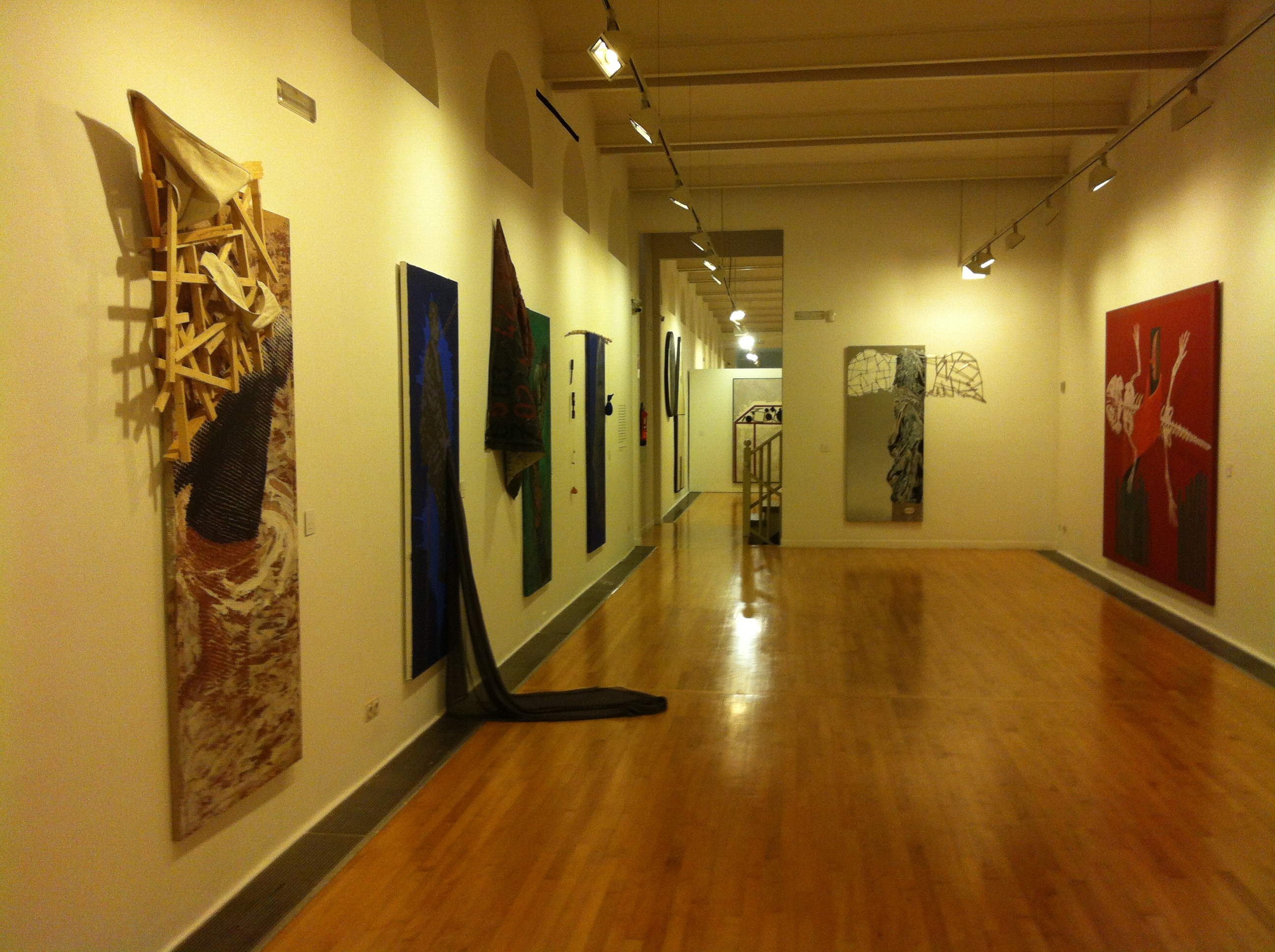
- Exhibit at the Sabadell Art Museum
- Born: Artur Heras i Sanz; April 1945; Xàtiva, Spain
- Died: 10 September 2026 (aged 81); Godella, Spain
- Occupation: Painter

Artur Heras i Sanz (April 1945 – 10 September 2026) was a Spanish painter.

After studying fine arts in Valencia, he collaborated with the weekly art magazine Valencia Semanal during the democratic transition. In 2013, he held an exhibition at the Espai Alfaro Hofmann titled Trade mark registered-Pintat i expandit.

Heras died in Godella on 10 September 2026, at the age of 81.
