= Saburō Yamashita =

Japanese politician (1930–2026)

- 山下 三郎

Mayor of Hatsukaichi
- In office November 3, 1991 – November 2, 2007

Personal details
- Born: January 1, 1930 Ōtake, Hiroshima, Japan
- Died: September 25, 2026 (aged 96) Hatsukaichi, Hiroshima, Japan
- Party: Independent
- Known for: One of the Atomic bomb survivors
- Awards: Order of the Rising Sun (2008)

Saburō Yamashita (Japanese: 山下 三郎, Yamashita Saburō; January 1, 1930 – September 25, 2026) was a Japanese politician and anti-nuclear activist. He served as the mayor of Hatsukaichi for four times from 1991 to 2007. He was also a survivor of the atomic bomb of Hiroshima.

== Early life ==
Saburō Yamashita was born in Hiroshima Prefecture on January 1, 1930. He studied at Sanyo High School. During World War II, at the age of 15, he worked as a student laborer at a military manufacturing plant in Hiroshima. On August 6, 1945, he survived the atomic bomb of Hiroshima, which killed both of his parents. He then was adopted into the Yamashita family in Saeki District, Hiroshima.

== Career ==
After the war, Yamashita worked as a farmer in agriculture. In 1995, he started his political career when he served as a member of the Miyauchi Village Council, and then the Hatsukaichi town council due to the merger. He was elected as the mayor in 1991 for Hatsukaichi. He won his first two elections unopposed in 1991 and 1995, and was re-elected again in 1999 and 2003. He served a total of four terms until 2007.

Yamashita retired in 2007 and was succeeded by the former deputy mayor, Katsuhiro Mano. In 2005, he published his autobiography, A Life Dedicated to Local Government: A 50-Year Journey in Politics, and later served as chairman of the Hiroshima Prefectural Council of Social Welfare.

== Personal life and death ==
In 2008, Yamashita was awarded the Order of the Rising Sun. He admitted to receiving 300,000 yen from Katsuyuki Kawai for the Hiroshima constituency in the July 2019 House of Councillors election as a bribe. He later returned the money at Kawai's office.

Yamashita died in Hatsukaichi on September 25, 2026, at the age of 96.
