= Vsevolod Bogdanov =

Russian journalist (1944–2026)

Bogdanov, before 2016

Vsevolod Leonidovich Bogdanov (Russian: Всеволод Леонидович Богданов; 6 February 1944 – 10 September 2026) was a Russian journalist. He was chairman of the Russian Union of Journalists from 1992 to 2017. Bogdanov died in September 2026, at the age of 82.

== Biography ==
Bogdanov was born in the Kholmogorsky District of Arkhangelsk Oblast, He was educated at the Saint Petersburg State University graduating in journalism. He started working for Arkhangelsk radio and then moved to newspapers. From 1969 to 1980 he was a reporter and then editor of Magadanskaya Pravda, a regional newspaper in the Russian Far East. Bogdanov moved from Magadan to Moscow in 1980.

From 1981 to 1986 he was a correspondent of the newspaper Sovetskaya Rossiya in Karelia and the Murmansk Region. From 1986 to 1989 he was head of the periodicals directorate of the State Committee for Publishing . From 1989 to 1991 he was a general director of Soviet Central Television.

Bogdanov was elected chairman of the Russian Union of Journalists, and retired from this post in 2017. He was also representative on the International Confederation of Unions of Journalists.

He was also a honorary visiting professor at the Saint Petersburg State University.

Bogdanov was married and had three daughters, his wife and the younger two daughters were also journalists.

== Awards ==
- Order of Honour (Russia) -2010
- Order of the Commonwealth - 2019
- Honoured Cultural Worker of the Russian Federation
