= Jean-Pierre Jouët =

French shipbuilder and event organiser (1927–2026)

Jean-Pierre Jouët (1927 – 9 September 2026) was a French shipbuilder and event organiser. He played a foundational role in the development of France's recreational boating industry.

== Life and career ==
Jean-Pierre Jouët was born in 1927. He was the son of Paul Jouët. In 1920, his father and his first partner, Antoine Blondeau, founded the shipyard Chantier Naval de Sartrouville. In 1925, Jouët hired naval architect Eugène Cornu who was instrumental in the company's designs. In 1927, it became Paul Jouët et Cie. It occupied a 15,000 square meter workshop in Sartrouville, in Yvelines, and employed 90 people.

In 1951, after Jouët graduated from Ecole Centrale, he took over management of the shipyard. Under his guidance, the yard transitioned from traditional wood building to molded wood and polyester. This shift helped industrialize production, making sailing accessible to the broader French public with iconic early mass-produced boats like the Golif and the Bélouga.

In 1962, Jouët helped establish the trade organization that became the Fédération des industries nautiques. He served as its first president. He was a co-founder and the first president of the Paris International Boat Show, first hosted at the CNIT in La Défense in 1962. He returned to run the event as its general commissioner from 1982 to 1996, managing its major move to the larger Porte de Versailles exhibition halls in 1987.

After the shipyard was sold in 1965, Jouët became active in the French cultural world. In the early 1970s, he founded the company OIP which started and managed major national events, including the Paris Book Fair (Salon du Livre), the Foire Internationale d'Art Contemporain, the classical music fair Musicora, Rétromobile, and Expolangues.

Jouët died on 9 September 2026, at the age of 99.
