= Robert Poinard =

French priest, journalist and chaplain (1948–2026)

- Born: 19 October 1948; Saint-Étienne, France
- Died: 8 September 2026 (aged 77)
- Occupations: Priest; Journalist; Chaplain

Robert Poinard (French: [ʁobˈɛʁ pwanˈaʁ]; 19 October 1948 – 8 September 2026) was a French priest, journalist and chaplain.

Poinard served 12 years as a journalist for Le Dauphiné libéré and La Croix before his ordination into the priesthood on 18 September 1977. He then worked as a chaplain for several military schools before he was named Vicar General of the Diocese of the French Armed Forces in 2008 by Pope Benedict XVI. He was named a Knight of the Legion of Honour in 2014. In 2016, he published annotated notebooks of a World War I soldier. That year, he was appointed by the Bishops' Conference of France as the Director of the Aumônerie générale des Français de l'étranger. In 2019, he was named a lecturer at the Studium de droit canonique de Lyon. From 2022 to 2025, he was chancellor of the Archdiocese of Lyon.

Poinard died on 8 September 2026, at the age of 77.

== Publications ==
- Tournus. Abbaye Saint-Philibert (1978)
- L'aumônier militaire d'Ancien Régime : La vie du prêtre aux armées des guerres de religion à la Première République (1568-1795) (2012)
- Carnets de guerre de l'abbé Léon Cabaret (1914-1918) (2016)
