= Tahir Nikšić =

Bosnian actor and theatre artist (1950–2026)

- Born: 12 June 1950; Mostar, PR Bosnia and Herzegovina, FPR Yugoslavia
- Died: 4 September 2026 (aged 76)
- Occupation: Actor
- Years active: 1978–2026

Tahir Nikšić (12 June 1950 – 4 September 2026) was a Bosnian actor and theatre artist. He started acting at the National Theatre Mostar, after which he went to Sarajevo where he graduated from the Philosophy College, department of acting, in 1975. In 1974 he began working at the Sarajevo National Theatre. He played in a number of drama serials and television films and performed in over 100 theatre performances. He served as a Sarajevo National Theatre manager in 2000.

Nikšić died on 4 September 2026, at the age of 76.
