= Alyette Debray-Mauduy =

French journalist (1969–2026)

- Born: 5 March 1969
- Died: 21 September 2026 (aged 57); Paris, France
- Education: Paris-Panthéon-Assas University
- Occupation: Journalist

Alyette Debray-Mauduy (French: [aljˈɛt dəbʁˈɛ-modyˈi]; 5 March 1969 – 21 September 2026) was a French journalist.

Debray-Mauduy was best known for her time as deputy editor-in-chief of the "Art et vivre" service of the newspaper Le Figaro.

== Life and career ==
Born on 5 March 1969, Debray-Mauduy was the granddaughter of Georges Debray, former secretary of the Conférence des avocats du barreau de Paris. She was also the granddaughter of politician Janine Alexandre-Debray and the cousin of writer Laurence Debray. She was married to Jean-Philippe Mauduy, with whom she had two children: Alexia and Thomas. After her studies at Paris-Panthéon-Assas University, she joined Le Figaro and eventually became deputy editor-in-chief of the "Art et vivre" service. Her coverage led her to become a prominent journalistic figure within the golf community in France.

Debray-Mauduy died in Paris on 21 September 2026 when her bicycle was struck by a truck on the Pont de la Concorde. She was 57. The response time by the ambulance was lengthened due to Pope Leo XIV's visit to the Place de la Concorde.
