= Jonathan Cooper (luthier) =

American luthier (1950–2026)

- Born: Jonathan Gelula Cooper; May 17, 1950; Boston, Massachusetts, U.S.
- Died: September 7, 2026 (aged 76); Scarborough, Maine, U.S.
- Occupation: Luthier
- Spouse(s): Leanne Daniels (divorced) Liz Bieber

Jonathan Gelula Cooper (May 17, 1950 – September 7, 2026) was an American musician and luthier, known for his handcrafted violins.

== Early life and career ==
Jonathan Gelula Cooper was born in Boston, Massachusetts, on May 17, 1950, the son of Daniel Cooper, a worker at Bell Labs, and Bette Gelula, an artist, he moved with his family as a child to Morristown, New Jersey. He taught himself guitar, and played in bands in New Jersey. He attended an experimental program at Nasson College, and he moved to Franconia, New Hampshire, in 1971. He attended a summer course at the University of New Hampshire in 1976.

He studied with Gregg Alf for three years in Cremona. As a luthier, he built and crafted over 500 violins. His violins were admired by fiddle players Mark O'Connor, Alison Krauss and Michael Doucet. According to Portland Press Herald, he owned Acoustic Artisans, a shop in Portland, Maine.

== Personal life and death ==
Cooper was married twice. He was first married to Leanne Daniels, a marriage that ended in divorce. He then married Liz Bieber. His second marriage lasted until his death in 2026.

Cooper died in Scarborough, Maine, on September 7, 2026, at the age of 76.
