= Tomaso Tommasi di Vignano =

Italian business executive (1947–2026)

Tomaso Tommasi di Vignano (1947 – 9 September 2026) was an Italian businessman, who was the executive Chairman of Hera Group for over 20 years, from the birth of Hera Spa in November 2002 until 27 April 2023, the natural expiry of his last term.

== Life and career ==
Born in Brescia in 1947, Di Vignano obtained a degree in law before beginning his career at SIP (Società Idroelettrica Piemontese SpA) in the Personnel Department. In 1989 he assumed the position of Personnel Director for the SIP Group. From December 1992 to May 1994 as CEO of Iritel SpA he undertook to transform the old state company into a new company which subsequently merged with Telecom Italia.

From 1994 to 1997 Di Vignano was general manager of Telecom Italia, responsible for the International, Business Customer and Residential Customer Divisions. In 1997, as CEO of STET - Società Finanziaria Telefonica, he successfully completed the merge of the company with Telecom Italia.

In 1997 he was appointed CEO of Telecom Italia and guided the process of complete privatization of the Group.

From 1999 to 2002 he held the post of Managing Director of the multiutility ACEGAS SpA in Trieste, and managed the process of privatization of that company, up through its placement on the stock market.

Di Vignano died on 9 September 2026, at the age of 79.
