= Josep María Trías de Bes =

Spanish politician (1944–2026)

Member of the Congress of Deputies for Barcelona
- In office 27 March 1996 – 29 July 1996
- Succeeded by: Salvador Sanz Palacio
- In office 9 September 1980 – 29 June 1993
- Preceded by: Joan Rigol

Personal details
- Born: Josep María Trías de Bes i Serra; 19 November 1944 Madrid, Spain
- Died: 10 September 2026 (aged 81) Barcelona, Spain
- Party: CDC (1979–1995); PP (1995–2009); UPyD (2009–2020)
- Education: University of Barcelona
- Occupation: Lawyer

Josep María Trías de Bes i Serra (19 November 1944 – 10 September 2026) was a Spanish politician of the Democratic Convergence of Catalonia (CDC) and the People's Party.

== Life and career ==
Born in Madrid on 19 November 1944, Trías de Bes was the grandson of fellow politician Josep Maria Trias de Bes i Giró. He studied law at the University of Barcelona and became a lawyer. He joined the CDC in 1977 and replaced Joan Rigol in the Congress of Deputies in 1980, representing the Barcelona constituency. He was fourth secretary of the Congress from 1982 to 1989 and fourth vice-president from 1989 to 1993. He announced his intention to not run for re-election in 1993 over disagreements with party leader Jordi Pujol.

Trías de Bes officially left the CDC in 1995 after opposing the party's growing relationship with the Spanish Socialist Workers' Party. He joined the PP that September and re-entered the Congress of Deputies in 1996. However, he resigned that July and was replaced by Salvador Sanz Palacio after being named chairman of transportation company Trasmediterránea. He left the company on 22 December 1999 in the midst of an internal crisis after the government had appointed a new CEO. In 2009, he announced his departure from the PP and joined Union, Progress and Democracy (UPyD).

Trías de Bes died on 10 September 2026, at the age of 81.
