= Remo Calzona =

Italian civil engineer (1939–2026)

Remo Calzona (19 January 1939 – 25 September 2026) was an Italian civil engineer. He was a professor at the Sapienza University of Rome. Calzona died on 25 September 2026, at the age of 87.
