= Richard Morávek =

Czech businessman and developer (1970–2026)

- Born: 26 March 1970; Zábřeh, Czechoslovakia
- Died: 17 September 2026 (aged 56); Olomouc, Czech Republic
- Occupations: Businessman, real estate developer, investor
- Organization: Redstone
- Spouse: Helena Morávková
- Children: 3

Richard Morávek (26 March 1970 – 17 September 2026) was a Czech businessman, real estate developer and investor based in Olomouc.

== Background ==
Morávek was born in Zábřeh on 26 March 1970. He spent his childhood in Mohelnice and Olomouc. Morávek graduated from the Jan Opletal Gymnasium in Litovel.

He entered the business sector in 1992, initially focusing on food wholesale, specifically the importation of canned exotic fruits and Thai food products. With the expansion of multinational supermarket chains into the Czech market, Morávek shifted his focus from wholesale to real estate and property development.

His early development projects were heavily concentrated in Olomouc, a city he frequently cited a strong personal attachment to. His portfolio later expanded to include projects in Pardubice, Ostrava, Prague, Brno, and international locations. His corporate strategy primarily targeted large-scale urban transformation and brownfield redevelopment.

Morávek had three children and five grandchildren. In July 2026, he sustained a severe head injury in a golf cart accident while vacationing in Spain. He was hospitalised and subsequently transferred to the Olomouc University Hospital in August, where he died on 17 September 2026, at the age of 56.

== Business career ==
Following his initial ventures in the food wholesale segment, Morávek co-founded Zenmex, s.r.o. with investor Ivan Gerši. This was followed by the establishment of several other corporate entities, notably Redstone Real Estate and SMC development.

Morávek was the primary investor and initiator behind a major urban development project in Olomouc, constructing a new city district along the banks of the Mlýnský stream starting in 2010. The first phase of this development, the Galerie Šantovka shopping center, opened in 2013. A subsequent residential phase, Šantovka Living, followed. A planned expansion, Šantovka District—comprising a theater, retail units, a hotel, residential housing, and public spaces—received a building permit in early 2026. The district was also slated to include a high-rise building, Šantovka Tower. However, the project faced significant legal and administrative hurdles after a court annulled its zoning decision, transferring jurisdiction to officials outside of Olomouc. The proposed 75-meter tower, located on the border of a historic preservation zone, faced opposition in 2018 from local residents and the Ministry of Culture, while the city council remained officially undecided on a building moratorium.

Other significant developments included the Envelopa Office Center and the proposed Nová Velkomoravská multipurpose arena, planned for a former military brownfield. This arena was intended to serve as the home venue for the HC Olomouc ice hockey team, alongside hosting other sports and events. In 2017, Morávek purchased the Olomouc Market (Tržnice) building for future investment, leasing the surrounding areas from the city through his company, Tržnice Hopa.

He also initiated plans to construct a large-scale, premium university housing complex for students and visiting academic staff near the Sokol building and athletics track in Olomouc, with construction scheduled to begin in 2026. In 2024, he bid for the purchase of the historical Hanácká Barracks in central Olomouc. According to Forbes, his total assets were valued at 11 billion CZK.

Outside of Olomouc, Morávek expanded into Prague, Ostrava and Pardubice. In Pardubice, he launched the Galerie Pernerka project. Upon its commencement in 2025, Galerie Pernerka became the largest ongoing construction project of its kind in the Czech Republic and the largest single construction investment in the Pardubice Region in over thirty years, with costs estimated at five billion CZK. In Ostrava, his Redstone Group acquired a large heavy-industry brownfield with plans to develop a new multifunctional district temporarily named Nové Vítkovice.

In 2023, he co-founded the Max Realitní property fund, which initially absorbed the Olomouc-based Galerie Šantovka and Envelopa Office Center, as well as the Palác Pardubice shopping center. In 2025, the fund expanded its portfolio by acquiring two major commercial and administrative centers in Prague: Palác Myslbek and OC Flora.

== Controversies ==
In his early career, Morávek was hired by businessman Tomáš Pitr to restructure the "Milo" company. Years later, after Milo's bankruptcy, Morávek acquired the former company's land to develop the Galerie Šantovka project, a venture in which he was aided by another controversial developer, Luděk Sekyra. Morávek's mother, Jarmila Morávková, was convicted of tax evasion in 1997 and 1999 alongside Jan Kondler. At the time, Morávková and Kondler managed the firm Inter Fish Holding CZ, where Morávek served as chairman of the board. Both Morávková and Kondler later received presidential pardons from Václav Klaus in 2008.

Morávek's name also surfaced in the "Krakatice" police wiretaps, which were published by investigative journalist Jaroslav Kmenta in 2010. According to reports by MF DNES, the recordings suggested that Morávek contacted organised crime figure František Mrázek to intervene with state authorities to halt a police investigation into his mother. The transcripts alleged that Morávek agreed to pay one million CZK for this intervention.

Critics have frequently argued that the city's collaboration agreement regarding the Šantovka and Šantovka Tower developments was financially disadvantageous for the statutory city of Olomouc. The agreement was signed in 2010 by then-mayor Martin Novotný, who later became the Director of External Relations for Morávek's Redstone group in 2021. The developer repeatedly leveraged this contract during the permitting process for Šantovka Tower.

The construction of Galerie Šantovka also faced criticism for its ecological and economic impacts. A controversial decision by the city council authorised the routing of a new tram line around the shopping center, connecting the city's most populated districts, Nové Sady and Povel. While the project disrupted the Mlýnský stream biocorridor, it simultaneously established a sustainable ecological transport route. The first phase of the tram line cost approximately 350 million CZK, with 65% of the funding subsidised by the Swiss-Czech Cooperation Programme.
