= Helmut Wiesinger =

Austrian stage and television actor (1952–2026)

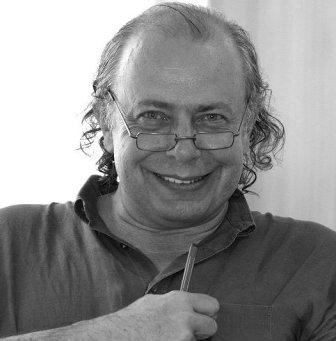
- Wiesinger in 2006
- Born: 28 January 1952; Linz, Upper Austria, Allied-occupied Austria
- Died: 9 September 2026 (aged 74)
- Education: Anton Bruckner Private University
- Occupation: Actor

Helmut Wiesinger (28 January 1952 – 9 September 2026) was an Austrian stage and television actor. He appeared in over 100 stage productions at the Landestheater Niederösterreich from 1998 to 2018.

Wiesinger died on 9 September 2026, at the age of 74.
