= Jean-Paul Desprat =

French historian and writer (1947–2026)

- Desprat in 2016
- Born: 13 June 1947; Drancy, France
- Died: 21 September 2026 (aged 79); Paris, France
- Education: Paris 1 Panthéon-Sorbonne University; Paris-Sorbonne University
- Occupations: Historian; Writer

Jean-Paul Desprat (13 June 1947 – 21 September 2026) was a French historian and writer.

A specialist in the 17th and 18th centuries, he wrote for numerous publishers and created the Prix littéraire du Pays noir.

Desprat died in Paris on 21 September 2026, at the age of 79.

== Publications ==
=== Biographies and historical essays ===
- Les Bâtards d’Henri IV. L’épopée des Vendômes, 1594–1727 (1994)
- Le Cardinal de Bernis. La Belle Ambition : 1715–1794 (2000)
- Henri IV. Le Règne de la tolérance (2001)
- Madame de Maintenon (1635–1719) ou Le Prix de la réputation (2003)
- Mirabeau. L'Excès et le Retrait (2008)
- Henri IV. Le Roi de la tolérance (2011)
- La France du Grand siècle : 1589–1715 (2012)
- Henri IV, roi de cœur (2018)
- Une histoire des Girondins (2025)
- Danton, bonhomme ou démon (2026)

=== Novels ===
==== La Fougère et les Lys ====
- Le Marquis des Éperviers (1988)
- Le Camp des enfants de Dieu (1989)
- Le Secret des Bourbons : novembre 1703 - avril 1704 (1991)

==== Les Couleurs du feu ====
- Bleu de Sèvres : 1759–1769 (2006)
- Jaune de Naples : 1770–1781 (2010)
- Rouge de Paris : 1789–1794 (2013)

==== Destinées indevinables ====
- Trois gouttes de vinaigre dans les saintes huiles ou La vie tumultueuse de Guiscard La Bourlie : 1658–1711 (1997)
- Les Princesses assassines (2016)
- Le Guerrier philosophe. Mémoires apocryphes du prince Eugène de Savoie (2020)

==== Standalone novels ====
- Gilles. La Musique aux temps du Roi-Soleil (1999)
- Au nom de la Pompadour (2001)
