= Deirdre McDermott =

Deirdre McDermott (28 June 1966 – 13 September 2026) was an Irish picture book publisher. She was the associate director at Walker Books.
