= Roberto Müller (singer) =

Brazilian singer (1937–2026)

- Born: February 17, 1937; Piracuruca, Piauí, Brazil
- Died: September 24, 2026 (aged 89) Recife, Pernambuco, Brazil
- Genre: Brega

José Ribamar da Silva (February 17, 1937 – September 24, 2026), better known as Roberto Müller, was a Brazilian singer.

Müller began his artistic career in 1955 at Rádio Timbira in São Luís, Maranhão. He earned six gold records. Müller died on September 24, 2026, at the age of 89.

== Discography ==
=== Albums ===
| Album | Year | Record label | Catalog Number | Notes/References |
|---|---|---|---|---|
| LP "Roberto Müller" | 1964 | CBS | 37388 | |
| LP "Amor Quando É Amor" | 1965 | CBS | 37427 | |
| LP "Perdoada" | 1966 | CBS | 37449 | |
| LP "Vitima De Amor" | 1967 | CBS | 37514 | |
| LP "Sofro Por Te Amar" | 1968 | CBS | 37572 | |
| LP "Volta Meu Amor" | 1969 | CBS | 37621 | |
| LP "Tua Lembrança" | 1970 | CBS | 37676 | |
| LP "Meu Mundo De Esperança" | 1971 | CBS | 137733 | |
| LP "O Romântico" | 1971 | Copacabana | CLP 11647 | |
| LP "Roberto Müller" | 1972 | Copacabana | CLP 11679 | |
| LP "Roberto Müller" | 1973 | Copacabana | CLP 11718 | |
| LP "Roberto Müller" | 1974 | Copacabana | COLP 11937 | |
| LP "O Romântico De Sempre" | 1975 | Som/Copacabana | SOLP 40642 | |
| LP "O Romântico Do Povo" | 1976 | Tapecar | SS.022 | |
| LP "O Melhor Dos Boleros" | 1977 | Tapecar | SS.034 | |
| LP "Mas Eu Gosto De Te Amar" | 1978 | Tapecar | SS.26.044 | |
| LP "Profecia" | 1981 | Jangada/EMI-Odeon | 036 422542 | |
| LP "Por Uma Mulher" | 1982 | Jangada/EMI-Odeon | 036 422551 | |
| LP "Roberto Müller" | 1987 | Gravasom | GVLP 5008 | |

=== Collections ===
| Album | Year | Record label | Catalog Number | Notes/References |
|---|---|---|---|---|
| LP "Os Grandes Sucessos De Roberto Müller" | 1975 | Tropicana/CBS | 01340 | |
| LP "Os Grandes Sucessos De Roberto Müller Vol. 2" | 1975 | Okeh/CBS | 112310 | |
| CD "Brasil Popular – Roberto Müller" | 2006 | Sony Music | 845.025/2-476497 | |
