= Harriet Hancock =

American activist and lawyer (1936–2026)

Harriet Daniels Hancock (September 25, 1936 – September 23, 2026) was an American activist and lawyer known for her work as an activist for the LGBTQ community in South Carolina. She founded the first southeast chapter of PFLAG. Hancock was born in Columbia, South Carolina. She became an activist for the LGBTQ community in South Carolina after her son, Greg, came out to her as gay in 1980. She later continued her activism with the Harriet Hancock Community Center, the first center for LGBTQ resources in South Carolina.

== Early life and education ==
Hancock was born in Columbia, South Carolina, on September 25, 1936, to Elizabeth and Harry Daniels. She grew up one of four children to working class parents. She attended Columbia High School, where she learned cosmetology. Hancock married her husband at 18, and had her first child at 19, having three in total.

She moved to several states with her husband, who worked in New Jersey for the RCA and later in Florida on the United States space program during the 1960s. Hancock later moved with her family to Washington DC and Maryland. In 1978, she returned to Columbia after separating from her husband due to his alcoholism, from which he would die the following year.

Hancock attended the University of South Carolina after she returned to Columbia, getting a degree in sociology. She later would attend law school there.

== Activism ==
In 1981, Hancock's son, Greg, came out to her as gay. This led Hancock to become an activist for the LGBTQ community during the 1980s. In 1982, she founded a branch of PFLAG in South Carolina.

Hancock provided support to men with HIV, primarily in providing visitation to those hospitalized by it. Hancock also cofounded PALSS, the Palmetto AIDS Life Support Services, which provided support to those affected by HIV, including advocacy and education. This would also shift her law career towards legal work for the LGBTQ community, including pro bono work for gay men with HIV.

In 1989, Hancock began to organize the first pride parade in Columbia at an LGBTQ community picnic. It took place the following year in 1990. An estimated 2000 people marched through Columbia's Main Street toward the South Carolina Capitol Building.

In 1994, Hancock purchased a building to provide as a community center for local members of the LGBTQ community to discuss plans for activism and future pride events. This would later be renamed to the Harriet Hancock Center, which now provides resources for the LGBTQ community.

In later years, Hancock shifted her activism towards focusing on advocacy for transgender individuals in the south.

== Death ==
Hancock died on September 23, 2026, two days short of her 90th birthday. Her death was announced by the Harriet Hancock Center on the same day.
