= Edmée Buclin-Favre =

Swiss feminist activist and lawyer (1927–2026)

- Born: 1927; Sion, Valais, Switzerland
- Died: 2 September 2026 (aged 99); Sion, Valais, Switzerland
- Education: University of Fribourg (Lic.)
- Occupations: Activist; lawyer

Edmée Buclin-Favre (1927 – 2 September 2026) was a Swiss feminist activist and lawyer.

== Life and career ==
Born in Sion in 1927, Buclin-Favre was the daughter of MP and judge Antoine Favre and Jeanne-Marie Feigel. She married in 1952 and had three children.

Buclin-Favre earned her matura from the Collège des Dames Blanches in 1946 before earning a licentiate in law from the University of Fribourg in 1949. She joined the Association valaisanne pour le suffrage féminin in 1963 while Renée de Sépibus served as its president. In 1982, she became second vice president of the Commission d'étude sur la condition féminine en Valais before becoming president of the Commission cantonale pour les questions d'égalité in 1993. In 1995, after her longtime membership in the Christian Democratic Party, she co-founded the nonpartisan organization "Solidarité Femmes". From 1999 to 2005, she was president of the Fédération suisse des retraités.

Buclin-Favre died in Sion on 2 September 2026, at the age of 99.
