= Georg Westenfelder =

German organ builder (1935–2026)

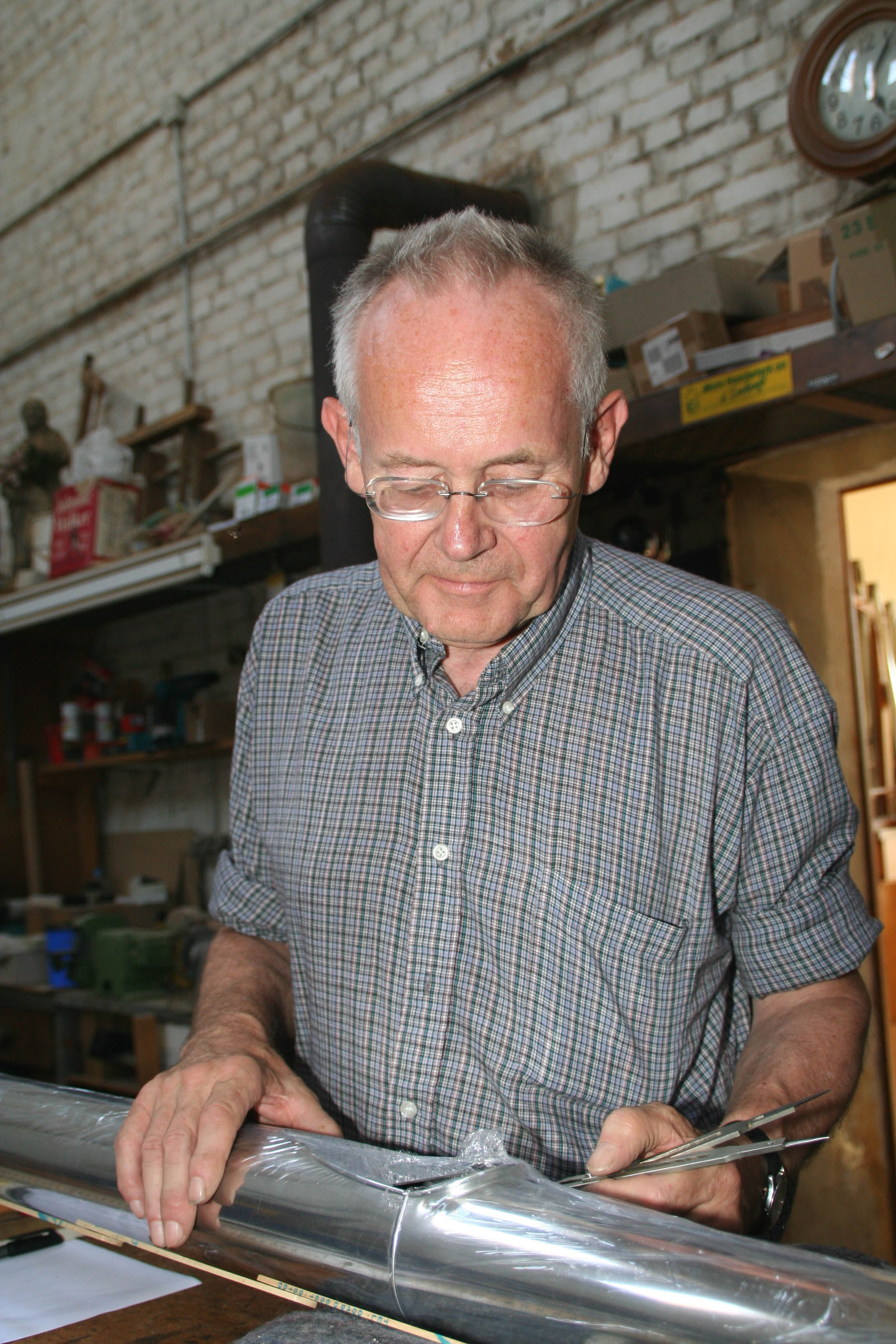
- Westenfelder in 2006
- Born: 8 August 1935; Stuttgart, Gau Württemberg-Hohenzollern, Germany
- Died: 7 September 2026 (aged 91)
- Occupation: Organ builder

Georg Westenfelder (8 August 1935 – 7 September 2026) was a German organ builder.

Westenfelder was the owner of the Uergelmanufaktur Georg Westenfelder organ shop, which he led from 1967 to 2020. After he retired, Uergelmanufaktur Schumacher from Eupen took over the shop.

Westenfelder died on 7 September 2026, at the age of 91.
