= Domingo Buesa Conde =

Spanish historian and writer (1952–2026)

Domingo Buesa Conde (25 December 1952 – 16 September 2026) was a Spanish historian, writer, politician and Aragonese cultural advocate. Born in Sabiñánigo on 25 December 1952, he died in Zaragoza on 16 September 2026, at the age of 73.
