= Juan Guillermo Ríos =

Colombian newscaster and journalist (1947–2026)

Juan Guillermo Ríos (20 December 1947 – 6 September 2026) was a Colombian newscaster and journalist. He was best known during the 1980s for his appearances on Noticiero de las 7 (English: 7 o'clock news).

Juan Guillermo Ríos was born in Medellín on 20 December 1947. He died in Medellín on 6 September 2026, at the age of 78.
