= Felton Earls =

American child psychiatrist (1942–2026)

Felton James Earls
- Born: January 20, 1942; New Orleans, Louisiana, U.S.
- Died: September 5, 2026 (aged 84); Massachusetts, U.S.
- Education: Howard University, BS (Chemistry), MD
- Occupations: Child psychiatrist, social epidemiologist, medical educator
- Spouse(s): Mary Carlson, a.k.a. Maya Carlson
- Children: two daughters, Leigh, born in 1967, and Tanya, born in 1974

Felton James "Tony" Earls III (January 20, 1942 – September 5, 2026) was an American child psychiatrist and epidemiologist, currently Professor of Social Medicine, Emeritus, Harvard Medical School, and Professor of Human Behavior and Development, Emeritus, Harvard T.H. Chan School of Public Health; and formerly the Blanche F. Ittleson Professor of Child Psychiatry at Harvard Medical School, and an Elected Fellow of the American Association for the Advancement of Science, American Academy of Political and Social Science, American Academy of Arts and Sciences. He is known for a long-term study of the influence of neighbors' willingness to help each other on the neighborhood's crime rate.

Earls died in Massachusetts on September 5, 2026, at the age of 84.
