= Patrick Zelnik =

French businessman and editor (1946–2026)

- Zelnik in 2008
- Born: 10 November 1946
- Died: 17 September 2026 (aged 79); Paris, France
- Education: Sciences Po; Paris Dauphine-PSL University
- Occupations: Businessman; Editor

Patrick Zelnik (French: [patʁˈik zɛlnˈik]; 10 November 1946 – 17 September 2026) was a French businessman and editor.

A graduate of the Sciences Po and Paris Dauphine-PSL University, he was the founder of Virgin France after he was entrusted to do so by Richard Branson. He left Virgin in 1997 and co-founded Naïve Records. In 2006, he became president of the Syndicat européen des sociétés phonographiques indépendantes. The Naïve group filed for bankruptcy in 2016 and was acquired by Believe Music.

Zelnik died on 17 September 2026, at the age of 79.
