= Stanisław Szelc =

Polish satirist and actor (1943–2026)

Stanisław Szelc (2 January 1943 – 21 September 2026) was a Polish satirist and actor. He was a recipient of the Gloria Artis Medal for Merit to Culture (2009).

Szelc died on 21 September 2026, at the age of 83.
