= JJ Pionke =

American librarian and disability advocate (1978–2026)

- Born: 1978; Chicago, Illinois, U.S.
- Died: September 21, 2026 (aged 47–48); Ames, Iowa, U.S.
- Education: Truman State University (BA, MA); University of Michigan (MSI)
- Occupations: Librarian, library and information studies educator, disability advocate
- Notable work: DisLIS: Disability in Library and Information Studies; Disability Justice in Libraries
- Awards: University of Illinois Arnold O. Beckman Research Award (2017); IACRL People’s Choice Award in Scholarly Publishing (2020); Medical Library Association Presidents Award (2021); Library Journal Movers and Shakers (2021)

JJ Pionke (1978 – September 21, 2026) was an American librarian, academic and disability advocate. He served as Applied Health Sciences Librarian at the University of Illinois Urbana-Champaign from 2014 to 2023, and served as an adjunct instructor at Syracuse University from 2019 to 2026, teaching Accessible Library and Information Services.

== Early life and education ==
JJ Pionke was born in Chicago, Illinois in 1978. He attended Truman State University in Kirksville, Missouri, earning BA degrees in English and History, and later an MA in English. In 2013, he graduated from the University of Michigan, Ann Arbor with a Master of Science in Information, Library Science, and Preservation of Information (equivalent to an MLIS).

== Career ==
As part of his work, he created research guides on various disabilities, including chronic illness and limb difference, used at his library and adapted for other facilities. The library implemented physical changes based on his work, including installing a handrail and rebuilding an entry ramp.

Pionke was recognized as one of Library Journal's Movers and Shakers in 2020 for his work on improving accessibility in the university library system. Pionke was a member of the editorial board of the Journal of Library Administration.

=== DisLIS ===
Pionke was also the editor of the open access journal Disability in Libraries and Information Studies (DisLIS). He has published a number of reviews in DisLIS, as well as interviews with disability scholar Margaret Price and authors Kate Bornstein and Caitlin Sullivan.

== Death ==
Pionke died in Ames, Iowa on September 21, 2026, after being hospitalized for an aggressive infection.

== Selected publications ==
- Pionke, JJ (2017). "Beyond ADA Compliance: The Library as a Place for All". Urban Library Journal. 23 (1).
- Pionke, JJ (2017). "Toward Holistic Accessibility: Narratives from Functionally Diverse Patrons". Reference & User Services Quarterly. 57 (1): 48–56.
- Pionke, JJ; Manson, Jaena (2017). "Creating Disability LibGuides with Accessibility in Mind". Journal of Web Librarianship. 12 (1): 63–79.
- Pionke, JJ (2019). "The Impact of Disbelief: On Being a Library Employee with a Disability". Library Trends. 67 (3): 423–435 – via Project MUSE.
- Pionke, JJ (2020). "Library Employee Views of Disability and Accessibility". Journal of Library Administration. 60 (2): 120–145.
- Pionke, JJ; Schomberg, J (2025). "Interview with Dr. Margaret Price on Crip Spacetime". DisLIS Author Interviews series. (Podcast). DisLIS.
