= Gabriel Contant =

Canadian painter (1931–2026)

- Born: 4 January 1931; Joliette, Quebec, Canada
- Died: 2026 (aged 95)
- Education: École des beaux-arts de Montréal
- Occupation: Painter

Gabriel Contant (4 January 1931 – 2026) was a Canadian painter.

Notably a student of Stanley Cosgrove at the École des beaux-arts de Montréal, his works are on permanent display at prominent museums, including the Musée Beaulne and the Musée national des beaux-arts du Québec.

Contant died in 2026, at the age of 95.
