= Bernice Offei =

Ghanaian gospel musician (1962/1963–2026)

- Born: 1962 or 1963; Accra, Ghana
- Died: 12 September 2026 (aged 63)
- Education: University of Ghana
- Occupations: Musician, banker

Bernice Offei (1962 or 1963 – 12 September 2026) was a Ghanaian award-winning gospel artist. She won Best Female Vocal Performance and Songwriter of the Year at the 2009 Vodafone Ghana Music Awards.

== Early life and education ==
Bernice Offei was born in Accra, Ghana. She had her secondary education at Achimota School in Accra, Ghana and was awarded an MPhil in crop science from the University of Ghana and an MSc in Information technology from the United Kingdom. She was popularly known for her hit songs “Hold On” and “Life is so short”.

== Career ==
Offei was a banker by profession and had been working with the Standard Chartered Bank.

== Personal life and death ==
Bernice Offei was married to Prof. Samuel Kwame Offei (formerly Pro-Vice Chancellor of University of Ghana) and a mother of two.

In September 2026, news of the gospel musician reported missing hit the internet. But she was found shortly after the family made a series of public calls on disappearance.

Offei died on 12 September 2026, at the age of 63.

== Discography ==
Bernice Offei released 6 albums, the 6th of which she recorded in 2007 titled "life", which won her two awards during the 10th edition of the MTN Ghana Music Awards as the Best Vocal Female Performer and the Song Writer of the year.

=== Studio albums ===
Title	Album details	Ref
We are Victors	released year: 1991	
Hold On	released year: 1997	
Me Kosu	released year: 2003	
Grateful	released year: 2004	
Life	released year: 2007	
