= Pierre Colin =

Pierre Colin was a French composer active between 1538 and 1572. He was a singer in the Sainte-Chapelle from 1532 to 1536. He was the organist and choirmaster of Autun Cathedral from 1539 until 1565 while serving as priest. His compositions were compiled by 1541 by Jacques Moderne, one of the earliest folios from a single composer. This publication consisted of magnificats, masses, and motets, numbering eight of each type. His Christus resurgens has been misattributed to Palestrina.

Colin's masses are classified as parody music. His most highly esteemed works are his thirty six motets, which demonstrate melodic sense, textual clarity, and timing.
