= Ahmad Nategh Nouri =

Iranian politician and sport administrator (1937–2026)

Ahmad Nategh Nouri (1937 – 25 September 2026) was an Iranian politician and sports administrator. He served as president of the Iran Boxing Federation from 1989 until his resignation in 2017. He was also a seven-term member of the Islamic Consultative Assembly, representing Nur and Mahmudabad in the first, third, fourth, fifth, sixth, seventh and eighth parliaments.

Nategh Nouri was born in 1937 in the village of Oz Kola, Nur County, Mazandaran province. He died on 25 September 2026, at the age of 89, after a long illness.
