= Neville Withers =

Australian rules footballer (1940–2026)

Personal information
- Full name: Neville Withers
- Born: 6 December 1940
- Died: 6 September 2026 (aged 85)
- Original team: Lakeside Rovers
- Height: 189 cm (6 ft 2 in)
- Weight: 84 kg (185 lb)

Playing career^{1}
Years	Club	Games (Goals)
1960–63	Collingwood	41 (7)
- ^{1} Playing statistics correct to the end of 1963.

Neville Withers (6 December 1940 – 6 September 2026) was an Australian rules footballer who played with Collingwood in the Victorian Football League (VFL). He died on 6 September 2026, at the age of 85.
