= Claudio Carsughi =

Italian-Brazilian sports journalist (1932–2026)

- Born: October 13, 1932; Arezzo, Italy
- Died: September 10, 2026 (aged 93); São Paulo, Brazil
- Education: University of Florence
- Occupation: Sports journalist
- Employer(s): Corriere dello Sport, Jovem Pan, Quatro Rodas
- Children: 2

Claudio Carsughi (13 October 1932 – 10 September 2026) was an Italian-Brazilian sports journalist. He worked for Corriere dello Sport, Rádio Jovem Pan, and Quatro Rodas.

Carsughi died on 10 September 2026, at the age of 93.
