= Morris Ballen =

American businessman (1938–2026)

Morris Louis Ballen (August 10, 1938 – September 21, 2026) was an American businessman. He was the owner and CEO of Disc Makers, a pioneering independent music distributor. Ballen died on September 21, 2026, at the age of 88.

== Disc Makers ==
Ballen's father, Ivin Ballen, founded the Ballen Record Co. in 1946, and Morris Ballen later changed the company's name to Disc Makers in 1959. The company, based in Pennsauken, New Jersey, manufactured small runs of vinyl records,cassettes and CDs. Ballen refocused it on independent artists, and by the end of the 1980s almost all of its business was done directly with musicians.

Disc Makers' tribute to him described its mission as giving independent artists access to the same professional-quality physical media the major labels had, at prices they could afford, with small order quantities suited to emerging artists; the company grew from a small regional vinyl pressing plant into a national market leader under his ownership. By 2006, Disc Makers was producing 20,000 titles a year and offered complete CD and DVD replication packages and a free barcode that let independent artists sell their products at retail. Ballen died at his home in Philadelphia, at 88.
