= Josef Buchner =

Austrian politician (1942–2026)

Mayor of Steyregg
- In office 1997–2012

Personal details
- Born: 2 March 1942 Hagenberg im Mühlkreis, Reichsgau Oberdonau, Germany
- Died: 30 September 2026 (aged 84)
- Party: The Greens – The Green Alternative

Josef Buchner (2 March 1942 – 30 September 2026) was an Austrian politician with The Greens – The Green Alternative. He was the mayor of Steyregg from 1997 to 2012. Buchner had previously been leader of the Vereinte Grüne Österreichs which merged with the Alternative Liste Österreichs in 1986 to form the current party. He died on 30 September 2026, at the age of 84.
