= Georges Taï Benson =

Ivorian television presenter (1946–2026)

- Benson in 2023
- Born: 25 January 1946; Abidjan, Ivory Coast, French West Africa
- Died: 25 September 2026 (aged 80); Abidjan, Ivory Coast
- Occupation: Television presenter

Georges Taï Benson (25 January 1946 – 25 September 2026) was an Ivorian television presenter. He died on 25 September 2026, at the age of 80.
