= Frank Bridel =

Swiss journalist and writer (1924–2026)

- Born: 25 December 1924; Lausanne, Vaud, Switzerland
- Died: 8 September 2026 (aged 101)
- Occupations: Journalist; Writer

Frank Bridel (25 December 1924 – 2 September 2026) was a Swiss journalist and writer.

Bridel notably served as editor-in-chief of the Gazette de Lausanne and was a longtime columnist at Entreprise romande.

Bridel died on 2 September 2026, at the age of 101.

== Publications ==
- Ces médicaments qui ont changé la vie (1985)
- La foule enchantée : entretiens avec Frank Bridel / André Charlet (2000)
- Témoin des hommes (2001)
- Francois Daulte. Paroles Vives (2001)
- Suisse mon amour - De A à Z, cinquante-deux coups de cœur (2011)
