= Michel Paulin =

French actor (1933–2026)

- Born: 24 September 1933; Nantes, France
- Died: 3 September 2026 (aged 92)
- Education: Conservatoire national supérieur d'art dramatique
- Occupation: Actor
- Years active: 1961–2022

Michel Paulin (French: [miʃˈɛl polˈɛ̃]; 24 September 1933 – 3 September 2026) was a French actor.

A graduate of the Conservatoire national supérieur d'art dramatique, he primarily specialized in dubbing.

Paulin died on 3 September 2026, at the age of 92.

== Filmography ==
- Les Cinq Dernières Minutes (1970)
- Les Fossés de Vincennes (1972)
- Dany the Ravager (1973)
- Nuits Rouges (1974)
- The Man Without a Face (1975)
- Le Triplé gagnant (1992)
