= Jean-François Le Nail =

French archivist and historian (1945–2026)

Jean-François Le Nail (23 December 1945 – 28 September 2026) was a French archivist and historian. He was a recipient of the Ordre national du Mérite and the Legion of Honour. Le Nail died on 28 September 2026, at the age of 80.
