= Ann Kaiser =

American academic (1948–2026)

- Born: March 1, 1948; Great Bend, Kansas, U.S.
- Died: September 13, 2026 (aged 78); Nashville, Tennessee, U.S.
- Education: Kansas State University; University of Kansas
- Occupation: Academic
- Spouse: William Ross Spears (died. 2003)
- Partner: Kye Fleming

Ann Kaiser (March 1, 1948 – September 13, 2026) was an American academic.

== Early life and career ==
Kaiser was born in Great Bend, Kansas, on March 1, 1948. She attended Kansas State University, earning her undergraduate degree in political science and speech in 1970. She also attended the University of Kansas, earning her PhD degree in child and developmental psychology in 1974. After earning her degrees, she completed her postdoctoral fellowship with the National Institutes of Health and the Kansas Neurological Institute.

She served as a professor in the department of special education at Vanderbilt University. During her years as a professor, she was named the Susan Gray Chair in Education and Human Development, and in 2001, she was named the Harvie Branscomb Distinguished Professor.

== Personal life and death ==
Ann was married to William Ross Spears until his death in 2003, after whom she became the partner of Kye Fleming. Their relationship lasted until her death in 2026.

Kaiser died in Nashville, Tennessee, on September 13, 2026, at the age of 78.
