= Bekeshevo =

Bekeshevo Бекешево
- Selo
- Location within Bashkortostan Location within Russia
- Coordinates: 52°44′N 58°04′E
- Country: Russia
- Region: Bashkortostan
- District: Baymaksky District
- Time zone: UTC+5:00

Bekeshevo (Russian: Бекешево; Bashkir: Бикеш, Bikeş) is a rural locality (a selo) and the administrative centre of Bekeshevsky Selsoviet, Baymaksky District, Bashkortostan, Russia. As of 2010, its population was 711. The locality has 10 streets.

== Geography ==
Bekeshevo is located 25 km northwest of Baymak the district's administrative centre by road. Verkhnetavlykayevo is the nearest rural locality.
