= Tsuneyuki Mitamura =

Japanese politician (1944–2026)

Tsuneyuki Mitamura (三田村 統之), known as Toji Mitamura (May 8, 1944 – September 16, 2026), was a Japanese politician. He served five terms as a member of the Fukuoka Prefectural Assembly from 1991 until 2008, including a tenure as Vice Speaker of the Fukuoka Prefectural Assembly from May 2005 to June 2006. Mitamura was then elected Mayor of the city of Yame, Fukuoka Prefecture, for four consecutive terms from November 16, 2008, until November 15, 2024. In 2026, Mitamura was awarded the Order of the Rising Sun, 3rd Class, Gold Rays with Neck Ribbon, for his service.

Mitamura died from complications of cirrhosis at a hospital in Yame city, on September 16, 2026, at the age of 82. He was survived by his wife, Ritsuko. His funeral was held at Koyeksha Ceremony Hall Kourin in Yame on September 19.
