= Gérard Jouault =

French volleyball coach (1952–2026)

- Jouault in 2014

Personal information
- Born: 31 January 1952; Vendin-le-Vieil, France
- Died: 20 September 2026 (aged 74)
- Height: 180 cm (5 ft 11 in)

Coaching information
Previous teams coached
Years	Teams
1971–1988; 1988–1995; 1994–1997; 1998–2005; 2007–2008; 2009–2012; 2014–2015	Calais et Arques; Stella Étoile Sportive Calais; France women's national team Loisirs inter sport Saint-Pierre Calais; Rwanda men's national team Loisirs inter sport Saint-Pierre Calais; Stella Étoile Sportive Calais

Gérard Jouault (French: [ʒeʁaʁ ʒwo]; 31 January 1952 – 20 September 2026) was a French volleyball coach.

In addition to his time as coach of the Rwandan men's national team and the French women's national team, he was champion of the Championnat de France féminin de Nationale 1 de volley-ball in 1993 with Stella Étoile Sportive Calais and champion of the Championnat de France d'Élite masculine de volley-ball with Loisirs inter sport Saint-Pierre Calais in 2001.

Jouault died on 20 September 2026, at the age of 74.
