= Alexandr Pashchenko =

Russian singer, actor and director (1945–2026)

Alexandr Kirillovich Pashchenko (Russian: Александр Кириллович Пащенко; 3 June 1945 – 8 September 2026) was a Russian singer, actor and director. He was awarded People's Artist of Russia in 2002. Pashchenko died on 8 September 2026, at the age of 81.
