= Zosima Ostapenko =

Russian Orthodox prelate (1950–2026)

Zosima Ostapenko (12 July 1950 – 25 September 2026) was a Russian Orthodox prelate. He died on 25 September 2026, at the age of 76.
