= Karl Finch =

American football player (1939–2026)

No. 88
- Position: Wide receiver

Personal information
- Born: July 7, 1939; Modesto, California, U.S.
- Died: September 15, 2026 (aged 87); Modesto, California, U.S.

Career information
- College: Cal Poly Pomona
- NFL draft: 1962: undrafted

Career history
- Los Angeles Rams (1962)
- Stats at Pro Football Reference

Karl Lee Finch (July 7, 1939 – September 15, 2026) was an American professional football player who was a wide receiver in the National Football League (NFL) for the Los Angeles Rams. He played college football for the Modesto Junior College Pirates and Cal Poly Pomona Broncos.

== College career ==
In addition to football, Finch played basketball and competed in track and field during his time at Cal Poly Ponoma. In 1961, he had 41 receptions for 767 yards and eight touchdowns. At Modesto Junior College, he was an all-league receiver, again competing in basketball and track, as well.

Finch was inducted into the Cal Poly Pomona Athletics Hall of Fame in 1987 and the Modesto Junior College Hall of Fame.

== Professional career ==
Finch signed with the Rams as a free agent in 1962, playing seven games. He later attended training camp with the Pittsburgh Steelers and San Francisco 49ers.

== Personal life and death ==
Following his football career, Finch worked as a teacher and coach in the Modesto school system for 36. He and his wife, Sandra, were married for 68 years. Finch died in Modesto on September 15, 2026, at the age of 87.
