= Peter Sincock =

Australian cricketer (1948–2026)

Personal information
- Full name: Peter Damien Sincock
- Born: 8 July 1948; Adelaide, South Australia, Australia
- Died: 8 September 2026 (aged 78)
- Batting: Right-handed

Domestic team information
- Years: Team
- 1974/75: South Australia
- Source: Cricinfo, 25 September 2020

Peter Damien Sincock (8 July 1948 – 8 September 2026) was an Australian cricketer. He played in five first-class matches for South Australia in 1974/75.

== See also ==
- List of South Australian representative cricketers
