= Pilar Malla Escofet =

Spanish politician (1931–2026)

Ombudsman of Barcelona
- In office 2004–2010
- Preceded by: Position created
- Succeeded by: Maria Assumpció Vilà Planas

Member of the Parliament of Catalonia for Barcelona
- In office 25 October 1999 – 23 September 2003

Personal details
- Born: 9 September 1931 El Pont d'Armentera, Spain
- Died: 16 September 2026 (aged 95)
- Party: PSC
- Occupation: Trade unionist

Pilar Malla Escofet (9 September 1931 – 16 September 2026) was a Spanish politician. A member of the Socialists' Party of Catalonia, she served in the Parliament of Catalonia from 1999 to 2003.

Malla died on 16 September 2026, at the age of 95.
