= Marc de La Ménardière =

French environmental activist and filmmaker (1982–2026)

- Born: March 1982
- Died: 13 September 2026 (aged 44)
- Occupations: Activist; Filmmaker

Marc de La Ménardière (French: [mˈaʁk dˈə- lˈa- menaʁdjˈɛʁ]; March 1982 – 13 September 2026) was a French environmental activist and filmmaker.

== Life and career ==
Born in March 1982, de La Ménardière graduated from business school and worked in New York City as a business developer for Danone. In the late 2000s, he suffered an accident and was homebound for a period of time, during which he watched numerous documentaries discussing the state of the environment and made him question his career path. He gradually shifted away from his business career and began to focus on filmmaking and public speaking. He travelled with his friend, Nathaniël Coste, to explore different worldviews and ecological and social crises. There, he met figures such as Vandana Shiva, Pierre Rabhi, Frédéric Lenoir, and Satish Kumar. In 2015, he released a documentary film titled A Quest for Meaning. The film was funded by 963 international backers and distributed by the independent Association Kamea Meah. In the wake of the film's release, he raised awareness through a public speaking campaign on topics such as ecology, self-awareness, interdependence, organizational transformation, and changing lifestyles. In 2017, he co-founded an eco-community called La Kambrousse alongside his partner Malory Malmasson.

De La Ménardière died from cancer on 13 September 2026, at the age of 44.
