= Huguette St-Denis =

Canadian screenwriter and actress (1964–2026)

- Born: Stéphane St-Denis; 6 November 1964; Montreal, Quebec, Canada
- Died: 3 September 2026 (aged 61)
- Education: École nationale de l'humour
- Occupations: Screenwriter; Actress

Huguette St-Denis (6 November 1964 – 3 September 2026) was a Canadian screenwriter and actress.

Initially working as a French teacher in Saint-Hyacinthe, she enrolled in the comedy writing program at the École nationale de l'humour in the 2000s. She began writing television shows and collaborating with artists such as Martin Matte, Laurent Paquin, and Rachid Badouri. In 2010, she came out as a transgender woman while working on the set of Bienvenue aux dames; despite initial support from her colleagues, she received fewer contracts in the entertainment industry following the announcement.

St-Denis died on 3 September 2026, at the age of 61.

== Filmography ==
=== Screenwriter ===
- Watatatow (2001)
- Histoires de filles (2001)
- Réal-TV (2001)
- Max Inc. (2002)
- Dangerous People (2002)
- Les Boys (2007)
- Kaboum (2007)
- The Parent Family (2008)
- Bienvenue aux dames (2010)
- L'Œil du cyclone (2022)

=== Actress ===
- Dangerous People (2002)
- L'Œil du cyclone (2010)
