= Umberto Pizzi =

Italian photojournalist (1937–2026)

- Pizzi in 2024
- Born: 7 October 1937; Zagarolo, Italy
- Died: 29 September 2026 (aged 88); Rome, Italy
- Occupation: Photojournalist

Umberto Pizzi (7 October 1937 – 29 September 2026) was an Italian photojournalist. He was best known for publishing his photographs in the magazines Time and People.

Pizzi died in Rome on 29 September 2026, at the age of 88.
