= Jerry Golod =

American television producer (1938–2026)

Jerry Golod (December 26, 1938 – September 30, 2026) was an American television producer. He produced for television programs including Tales from the Darkside, Adderly and Land of the Lost.

Golod died from cancer at his home in Rancho Mirage, California on September 30, 2026, at the age of 87.
