= Stanisław Małkowski =

Polish priest and activist (1944–2026)

Stanisław Małkowski (29 July 1944 – 7 September 2026) was a Polish Roman Catholic priest, publicist and activist of the democratic opposition in the Polish People's Republic.

In 2006, for his "merits for the independence of the Republic of Poland and for his activities for democratic changes in the country", he was awarded the Commander's Cross of the Order of Polonia Restituta.

In 2021, in recognition of his outstanding achievements in pastoral work, for his heroic attitude as the chaplain of Solidarity, supporting with words and deeds the fight for an independent and just Poland, standing on the side of goodness and truth in defence of inalienable human rights, he was awarded the Order of the White Eagle.

Małkowski died on 7 September 2026, at the age of 82.
