= Norman Irwin =

Northern Irish World War II veteran (1918–2026)

- Born: William Norman Wilson Irwin; 17 November 1918; Coleraine, County Londonderry, Ireland
- Died: 2 September 2026 (aged 107); Coleraine, County Londonderry, Northern Ireland
- Children: 4
- Military career
- Allegiance: United Kingdom
- Branch: British Army
- Service years: 1939-1946
- Rank: Sergeant
- Units: Coleraine Battery, Royal Artillery; Royal Electrical and Mechanical Engineers
- Awards: British Empire Medal (BEM)

William Norman Wilson Irwin (17 November 1918 – 2 September 2026) was a Northern Irish World War II veteran and centenarian from Coleraine, County Londonderry. He served in the Royal Artillery and later in the Royal Electrical and Mechanical Engineers (REME), and was awarded the British Empire Medal in the King's Birthday Honours in 2025. Irwin was recognised as Northern Ireland's oldest man at the age of 107.

== Biography ==
William Norman Wilson Irwin was born on 17 November 1918 in the townland of Macleary, near Coleraine, County Londonderry, Ireland (later Northern Ireland), to David Irwin and Annie Irwin (née Pollock). He undertook an engineering apprenticeship at Moore's Foundry in Coleraine before joining the army.

Irwin joined the Coleraine Battery of the Royal Artillery in 1939, shortly before the outbreak of World War II, at the age of 20. He served in Egypt, Libya, Tunisia, Syria, Palestine, and Italy, and took part in operations to protect the Suez Canal. Irwin later described the scale of the North African campaign, saying that "people just didn't understand the distances when they talk about the Germans when they chased us back across north Africa, it was about 1,500 miles". In 1942, his mechanical skills resulted in a transfer to the newly formed Royal Electrical and Mechanical Engineers, where he later attained the rank of sergeant. While posted to Hawick in the Scottish Borders in 1945, he met Margaret. They married in 1946. He left the army in October that year. The couple later had four children.

He later worked as an engineer at the Benger's factory site in Coleraine, which was later operated by Kerry Foods and then Pickering's Foods, a subsidiary of Heinz, and remained there as Engineering Manager until he retired. He also helped establish the Coleraine Winemakers Club, the town's Rotary Club, and the Agivey Anglers Association.

Irwin was named in the 2025 King's Birthday Honours and received the British Empire Medal for voluntary work from Anne, Princess Royal, at Hillsborough Castle in September 2025.

Irwin died at the Cottage Care Home in Coleraine, on 2 September 2026, aged 107. His funeral took place on 19 September at New Row Presbyterian Church, followed by burial in Coleraine Cemetery.
