= Pierre de Chastonay =

Swiss politician (1931–2026)

Member of the Swiss National Council
- In office 1 December 1975 – 29 November 1987

Member of the Grand Council of Valais
- In office March 1969 – 21 March 1977

Personal details
- Born: Pierre Victor de Chastonay; 20 June 1931 Sierre, Valais, Switzerland
- Died: 14 September 2026 (aged 95)
- Party: PDC
- Education: University of Geneva (Lic.); Centre européen universitaire de Nancy
- Occupation: Lawyer

Pierre Victor de Chastonay (20 June 1931 – 14 September 2026) was a Swiss politician of the Christian Democratic Party (PDC).

The son of politician Joseph de Chastonay and Marcelle de Chastenay (née Wolff), he earned a licentiate in law from the University of Geneva and also took classes at the Centre européen universitaire de Nancy. He married Maria Pia Valenti in 1961 and had a daughter.

De Chastonay served in the Grand Council of Valais from 1969 to 1977 and was a member of the National Council from 1975 to 1987. He also chaired the Pro Rawyl association.

De Chastonay died on 14 September 2026, at the age of 95.
