= Parlamentskaya Gazeta =

Russian parliamentary newspaper

- Native name: Парламентская газета (Russian)
- Type: Socio-political newspaper
- Format: A3
- Founders: Federation Council and State Duma
- Publisher: ANO Parlamentskaya Gazeta
- Editor-in-chief: Marat Abdullayev (acting)
- Founded: 7 May 1998; 28 years ago
- Language: Russian
- Headquarters: 28 1st Yamskogo Polya Street, Moscow
- Country: Russia
- Website: www.pnp.ru

Parlamentskaya Gazeta (Russian: Парламентская газета, lit. "Parliamentary Newspaper") is a Russian socio-political newspaper of the Federal Assembly of Russia. It was founded by the Federation Council and the State Duma. Its first issue was published on 7 May 1998. The newspaper publishes materials on the work of the chambers of parliament, the legislative process and the implementation of laws.

Since 1999, Parlamentskaya Gazeta has had the status of an official periodical publication of the Federal Assembly. Under Federal Law No. 185-FZ of 22 October 1999, the first publication of the full text of a federal constitutional law, a federal law or an act of a chamber of the Federal Assembly in Parlamentskaya Gazeta is recognized as official publication; federal constitutional laws and federal laws are required to be published in the newspaper.

== History ==
According to the National Electronic Library, issue No. 0 of Parlamentskaya Gazeta was dated 7 May 1998. The idea of creating a parliamentary media outlet has been attributed to State Duma chairman Gennady Seleznyov, who also proposed the newspaper's name.

In 2011–2012, the newspaper underwent a rebranding: it switched to colour printing, redesigned its layout and expanded its distribution through regional printing points. According to the National Electronic Library, the newspaper's issues included regional inserts and thematic supplements. In 2023, for the newspaper's 25th anniversary, Parlamentskaya Gazeta and the Russian State Library signed a licence agreement to provide open access to its archive through the National Electronic Library.

== Sanctions ==
On 9 November 2023, amid the Russian invasion of Ukraine, Canada added Parlamentskaya Gazeta to its sanctions list as part of measures against Russian individuals and entities accused of spreading disinformation and war propaganda.

== See also ==
- Rossiyskaya Gazeta
