= Pierre Collin (artist) =

French artist (1956–2026)

- Born: 27 September 1956; Paris, France
- Died: 15 September 2026 (aged 69); Vannes, France
- Education: Beaux-Arts de Paris; Casa de Velázquez
- Occupation: Artist

Pierre Collin (French: [pjˈɛʁ kɔlˈɛ̃]; 27 September 1956 – 15 September 2026) was a French painter, engraver.

== Life and career ==
Born in Paris on 27 September 1956, Collin was a descendant of the Luton family on his mother's side. He studied at the Beaux-Arts de Paris from 1975 to 1980 and subsequently at the Casa de Velázquez from 1980 to 1982 He began putting on exhibitions in 1983, notably in Paris, Washington, D.C., and Madrid. He married Corinne Véret, and the couple moved to Presqu'île de Conleau in 1999. In 2008, he held an exhibition at the Musée du dessin et de l'estampe originale de Gravelines, titled Vertiges ordinaires. On 25 April 2018, he was inducted into the Académie des Beaux-Arts, taking a seat previously held by René Quillivic.

Pierre Collin died in Vannes on 15 September 2026, at the age of 69.
