= Pietro Veglio =

Swiss economist (1944–2026)

- Born: 1944; Bellinzona, Ticino, Switzerland
- Died: 28 September 2026 (aged 81–82)
- Known for: Executive Director of the World Bank
- Scientific career
- Fields: Economics
- Workplaces: World Bank, OECD, University of St. Gallen

Pietro Veglio (1944 – 28 September 2026) was a Swiss economist. From 2001 he served as Executive Director of the World Bank. He was a visiting professor at the University of St. Gallen.

== Early career ==
Veglio began his career in 1969 at the Technical Cooperation Service (now the Directorate for Development and Cooperation, SDC) of the Department of Foreign Affairs.

== Inter-American Development Bank ==
After working at the technical cooperation service of the Swiss government, he was appointed deputy director at the Inter-American Development Bank, until 1992.

From 1992 to 1997, he worked as an advisor for the Swiss Executive Director at the World Bank in Washington, then as an expert in the institute's valuation division.

In November 1998 he became director of the evaluation division.

== OECD ==
After the World Bank, Veglio worked on the exam for countries of the Organization for Economic Cooperation and Development (OECD).

== Executive Director at the World Bank ==
In July 2001 Veglio was appointed by the Swiss Federal Council as Swiss Executive Director at the World Bank, where he replaced Matthias Meyer, who had been in office since November 1997.

== Death ==
Veglio died on 28 September 2026.
