= 2025 in Malaysia =

- Decades: 2000s; 2010s; 2020s
- See also: Other events of 2025; History of Malaysia • Timeline • Years

2025 in Malaysia is the 68th anniversary of Malaysia's independence and 62nd anniversary of its formation of Malaysia.

== Federal level ==
- Yang di-Pertuan Agong: Sultan Ibrahim of Johor
- Raja Permaisuri Agong: Raja Zarith Sofiah of Johor
- Deputy Yang di-Pertuan Agong: Sultan Nazrin Muizzuddin Shah of Perak
- Prime Minister: Anwar Ibrahim
- Deputy Prime Ministers: Ahmad Zahid Hamidi and Fadillah Yusof
- President of the Dewan Negara: Awang Bemee Awang Ali Basah
- Speaker of the Dewan Rakyat: Johari Abdul
- Chief Justice:
  - Tengku Maimun Tuan Mat (until 2 July)
  - Hasnah Mohammed Hashim (acting; from 3 July until 28 July)
  - Wan Ahmad Farid Wan Salleh (since 28 July)

== State level ==
- Johor:
  - Sultan of Johor: Tunku Ismail Idris (Regent)
  - Menteri Besar of Johor: Onn Hafiz Ghazi
- Kedah:
  - Sultan of Kedah: Sultan Sallehuddin
  - Menteri Besar of Kedah: Muhammad Sanusi Md Nor
- Kelantan:
  - Sultan of Kelantan: Sultan Muhammad V
  - Menteri Besar of Kelantan: Mohd Nassuruddin Daud
- Perlis:
  - Raja of Perlis: Tuanku Syed Sirajuddin
  - Menteri Besar of Perlis:
    - Mohd Shukri Ramli (until 25 December)
    - Abu Bakar Hamzah (from 28 December)
- Perak:
  - Sultan of Perak: Sultan Nazrin Muizzuddin Shah
  - Menteri Besar of Perak: Saarani Mohammad
- Pahang:
  - Sultan of Pahang: Al-Sultan Abdullah Ri'ayatuddin Al-Mustafa Billah Shah
  - Menteri Besar of Pahang: Wan Rosdy Wan Ismail
- Selangor:
  - Sultan of Selangor: Sultan Sharafuddin Idris Shah
  - Menteri Besar of Selangor: Amirudin Shari
- Terengganu:
  - Sultan of Terengganu: Sultan Mizan Zainal Abidin
  - Menteri Besar of Terengganu: Ahmad Samsuri Mokhtar
- Negeri Sembilan:
  - Yang di-Pertuan Besar of Negeri Sembilan: Tuanku Muhriz
  - Menteri Besar of Negeri Sembilan: Aminuddin Harun
- Penang:
  - Governor of Penang:
    - Tun Ahmad Fuzi Abdul Razak (until 30 April)
    - Tun Ramli Ngah Talib (from 1 May)
  - Chief Minister of Penang: Chow Kon Yeow
- Malacca:
  - Governor of Malacca: Tun Mohd Ali Rustam
  - Chief Minister of Malacca: Ab Rauf Yusoh
- Sarawak:
  - Governor of Sarawak: Tun Wan Junaidi Tuanku Jaafar
  - Premier of Sarawak: Amar Abang Johari Abang Openg
- Sabah:
  - Governor of Sabah: Tun Musa Aman
  - Chief Minister of Sabah: Hajiji Noor

== Events ==
=== January ===
- 1 January – Former Chief Minister of Sabah Tun Musa Aman is sworn in as the 11th Governor of Sabah, succeeding Tun Juhar Mahiruddin, whose tenure ended on 31 December 2024.
- 24 January – The Malaysian Maritime Enforcement Agency opens fire on a boat suspected of trespassing off the coast of Tanjung Rhu Beach, Banting, Selangor, killing an Indonesian migrant worker and injuring four others.

=== February ===
- 7–14 February – Malaysia at the 2025 Asian Winter Games in Harbin, Heilongjiang, China.
- 26 February
  - Search for Malaysia Airlines Flight MH370: The search for the missing aircraft of Malaysia Airlines Flight 370 resumes.
  - 1MDB drops a lawsuit it filed in the High Court against film producer and Najib's stepson Riza Aziz over the misappropriation of $248 million in public funds as part of the 1MDB scandal.

=== March ===
- 16 March – 2025 Democratic Action Party National Congress.

=== April ===
- 1 April – 2025 Putra Heights pipeline fire:
  - A section of a gas pipeline owned by Petronas is ruptured in Putra Heights, Selangor, causing a massive fire that injures 112 people.
- 26 April – 2025 Ayer Kuning by-election.

=== May ===
- 13 May – A truck carrying stones collides with a Federal Reserve Unit truck in Teluk Intan, Perak, killing nine.
- 24 May – The 2025 People's Justice Party leadership election ends with the election for the Central Leadership Council (MPP) Members, Central Women Committee Members and Central Youth Committee Members.
- 26–27 May – 2025 ASEAN Summits in Kuala Lumpur, Malaysia.
- 28 May – The ASEAN All-Stars defeat Manchester United 1-0 at a friendly held at Bukit Jalil National Stadium in Kuala Lumpur, Malaysia.
- 31 May – Malaysia's oldest horse racing institute Penang Turf Club holds its final race and closes down the Batu Gantong Racecourse, ending 160 years of horse racing activities in Penang and leaving Perak Turf Club and Selangor Turf Club as the only two remaining active turf clubs in Peninsular Malaysia.

=== June ===
- 9 June – 2025 Gerik bus crash:
  - A bus carrying university students collides with a car in Gerik, Perak, killing 15 people and injuring 31 others.
- 20 June – The High Court discharges former prime minister Mohammad Najib Abdul Razak in a money laundering charge under the 1MDB scandal.
- 20–22 June – Rainforest World Music Festival, one of Malaysia's largest musical events, is held near Mount Santubong in Kuching, Sarawak.

=== July ===
- 10 July – Former Prime Minister Mahathir Mohamad celebrates his 100th birthday, becoming the first Malaysian national leader to reach that age.
- 11 July – The Selangor Forest Park, which was created by the Forest Research Institute Malaysia, is designated as a World Heritage Site by UNESCO.
- 13 July – Mahathir Mohamad celebrates his 100th birthday with a public event in Putrajaya, Malaysia, but leaves early due to fatigue. He is later admitted to the National Heart Institute (IJN) for observation and discharged after several hours.
- 16 July – Zara Qairina Mahathir, A form one student in Papar, Sabah, is found dead after falling from the third floor of her school's dormitory building.
- 28 July – Negotiations to end the 2025 Cambodia–Thailand border crisis are held in Kuala Lumpur, Malaysia, culminating with prime minister Anwar Ibrahim declaring a ceasefire agreement between the warring countries.

=== August ===
- 1 August – The Civil Aviation Authority of Malaysia (CAAM) and the Malaysian Aviation Commission (MAVCOM) merge to establish a single national civil aviation regulatory body.
- 21 August – A McDonnell Douglas F/A-18 Hornet of the Royal Malaysian Air Force crashes shortly after takeoff from Sultan Haji Ahmad Shah Airport. The two pilots on board eject safely.
- 24 August – A magnitude 4.0 earthquake hits Johor, damaging several structures in Segamat, Johor.

=== September ===
- 27 September – The Kinabatangan Reserve is designated as a biosphere reserve by UNESCO.

=== October ===
- 14 October – Yap Shing Xuen, A form three student was killed by another student at a secondary school in Bandar Utama, Selangor.
- 22–31 October– Malaysia at the 2025 Asian Youth Games in Manama, Bahrain.
- 26–28 October: 2025 ASEAN Summits in Kuala Lumpur, Malaysia:
  - The 47th ASEAN Summit is held in Kuala Lumpur. The Cambodian and Thai governments sign the Kuala Lumpur Peace Accord, ending hostilities and normalising bilateral relations. Timor Leste joins ASEAN.
  - United States President Donald Trump undertakes his first visit to Malaysia and meets with Malaysian Prime Minister Anwar Ibrahim. The United States signs multiple trade agreements with Malaysia, Thailand, and Cambodia. Malaysia secures tariff exemptions for 1,711 products in its trade relations with the United States.
  - The United States enters into negotiations around trade and tariffs with China and Brazil in Kuala Lumpur.
  - Hundreds of pro-Palestinian protesters gather in Kuala Lumpur's Merdeka Square and Ampang Park to protest against the Trump Administration's support for Israel during the ongoing Gaza war.
- 27 October – The Malaysian and United States governments sign a memorandum of understanding to facilitate the development of critical minerals and rare earth minerals in partnership with American companies.

=== November ===
- 5 November – The High Court finds the Malaysian state and the Royal Malaysia Police responsible for the forced disappearance of pastor Raymond Koh in 2017 and orders them to pay at least 31 million ringgit ($7.4 million) in damages following a lawsuit filed by Koh's wife. The ruling is the first of its kind in Malaysian history.
- 6 November – A boat carrying migrants from Myanmar sinks near Langkawi, Kedah, killing at least 27 passengers.
- 24 November – The Government confirms it will introduce legislation in 2026 to ban children under the age of 16 years from social media platforms, citing online safety concerns.
- 28 November – Cyclone Senyar makes landfall over Peninsular Malaysia, leaving at least two people dead and forcing the evacuation of 34,000 people.
- 29 November – 2025 Sabah state election:
  - State-based parties such as Gabungan Rakyat Sabah and Warisan perform well, while peninsular-based parties such as Pakatan Harapan, Barisan Nasional and Perikatan Nasional suffer losses.

=== December ===
- 9–20 December – Malaysia at the 2025 SEA Games in Bangkok and Chonburi, Thailand:
  - With 1,142 athletes in 50 sports. It ranked 4th among the participating nations with 57 gold, 57 silver and 117 bronze medals.
- 14 December – 2025 Penang Bridge International Marathon at Sultan Abdul Halim Muadzam Shah Bridge.
- 22 December – The High Court rejects a request by former prime minister Mohammad Najib Abdul Razak to serve the remainder of his six-year prison sentence for graft over the 1MDB scandal under house arrest.
- 26 December – The High Court convicts former prime minister Mohammad Najib Abdul Razak on charges of abuse of power and money laundering of $700 million in funds over the 1MDB scandal and sentences him to 15 years' imprisonment and a fine of 13.5 billion ringgit ($3.3 billion).
- 31 December – The Malaysian government resumes its search for Malaysia Airlines Flight MH370.

== Art and entertainment ==
- 8th Malaysia International Film Festival

== National Day and Malaysia Day ==
=== Theme ===
Malaysia MADANI: Rakyat Disantuni (Civilised Malaysia: The People Are Respected)

=== National Day parade ===
Putrajaya Square, Persiaran Perdana, Putrajaya

=== Malaysia Day celebration ===
PICCA Butterworth Arena, Butterworth, Seberang Perai, Penang

== Deaths ==
=== January ===
- 14 January – Muhd Kamil Ibrahim, Academic and Writer.
- 19 January – Mohamad Hamsan Awang Supain, State Assistant Minister of Housing and Local Government of Sabah and Member of the Sabah State Legislative Assembly (MLA) for Sungai Sibuga, Sabah.
- 20 January – William Nyallau Badak, Former Member of Parliament (MP) for Lubok Antu, Sarawak.
- 27 January – Mohamed Taulan Mat Rasul, former Member of the Kedah State Executive Council and former Member of the Kedah State Legislative Assembly (MLA) for Tokai, Kedah.

=== February ===
- 22 February – Ishsam Shahruddin, Member of the Perak State Legislative Assembly (MLA) for Ayer Kuning, Perak.
- 25 February – Bakar Ali, former Member of the Terengganu State Legislative Assembly (MLA) for Kemasik, Terengganu.

=== March ===
- 6 March – Kamal Salih, economist, physician, policy advisor, administrator and politician, former MP for Wangsa Maju, Kuala Lumpur, Malaysia.

=== April ===
- 13 April – Salleh Kalbi, former Member of Parliament (MP) for Silam, Sabah.
- 14 April
  - Abdullah Ahmad Badawi, 8th Deputy Prime Minister (1999–2003) and 5th Prime Minister of Malaysia (2003–2009).
  - Mazlan Ahmad, Former Director-General of the National Sports Council.

=== May ===
- 1 May – Ramli Abu Bakar, former Member of the Kelantan State Legislative Assembly (MLA) for Wakaf Bharu, Kelantan.
- 20 May – Tun Ahmadshah Abdullah, 9th Governor of Sabah.
- 24 May – T. Gopinath Naidu – Former football player

=== June ===
- 17 June – Palanivel Govindasamy, 8th President of the Malaysian Indian Congress.
- 22 June – Raja Nurfatimah Mawar Raja Mohamed, Assistant Editor for News Entertainment of Berita Harian
- 26 June – Muhammad Nur Manuty, Islamic scholar, Writer, Politician and Former Member of Dewan Negara.
- 28 June – Kevin Nunis, Field hockey player.

=== July ===
- 16 July – Zara Qairina Mahathir, A 13-year-old Form 1 student, Disputed, believed to be based on bullying elements.

=== August ===
- 8 August – Mat Yasir Ikhsan, Former Member of Parliament (MP) for Sabak Bernam, Selangor.
- 25 August – Che Zakaria Mohd Salleh, former Member of the Johor State Legislative Assembly (MLA) for Permas, Johor.

=== September ===
- 7 September – Mohammad Razi Kail, former Member of the Negeri Sembilan State Executive Council and former Member of the Negeri Sembilan State Legislative Assembly (MLA) for Juasseh, Negeri Sembilan.
- 25 September – Datchinamurthy Kataiah, Convicted drug trafficker.
- 27 September – Chan Fu King, Former Member of Parliament (MP) for Teluk Intan, Perak.

=== October ===
- 1 October – Mohamed Hashim Mohd Ali, former Armed Forces chief.
- 8 October – Pannir Selvam Pranthaman, convicted drug trafficker.
- 14 October – Yap Shing Xuen, A 15-year-old Form 3 student, Murdered by stabbing.
- 28 October – Mohammad Taslim, former Member of the Johor State Legislative Assembly (MLA) for Maharani, Johor.

=== November ===
- 8 November – Abdul Rahman Abdul Kadir, former Member of the Penang State Legislative Assembly (MLA) for Penanti, Penang.

=== December ===
- 5 December – Bung Moktar Radin, Member of Parliament (MP) for Kinabatangan and Member of the Sabah State Legislative Assembly (MLA) for Lamag, Sabah.
- 8 December – William Yap, Singer and Actor.
- 13 December – Megat Najmuddin Megat Khas, former Member of the Selangor State Legislative Assembly (MLA) for Kelana Jaya, Selangor.

== See also ==
- 2025
- 2024 in Malaysia | 2026 in Malaysia
- History in Malaysia
