= 2026 in Malaysia =

- Decades: 2000s; 2010s; 2020s
- See also: Other events of 2026; History of Malaysia • Timeline • Years

2026 in Malaysia is the 69th anniversary of Malaysia's independence and 63rd anniversary of the formation of Malaysia.

== Federal level ==
- Yang di-Pertuan Agong: Sultan Ibrahim of Johor
- Raja Permaisuri Agong: Raja Zarith Sofiah of Johor
- Deputy Yang di-Pertuan Agong: Sultan Nazrin Muizzuddin Shah of Perak
- Prime Minister: Anwar Ibrahim
- Deputy Prime Ministers: Ahmad Zahid Hamidi and Fadillah Yusof
- President of the Dewan Negara: Awang Bemee Awang Ali Basah
- Speaker of the Dewan Rakyat: Johari Abdul
- Chief Justice: Wan Ahmad Farid Wan Salleh

== State level ==
- Johor:
  - Sultan of Johor: Tunku Ismail Idris (Regent)
  - Menteri Besar of Johor: Onn Hafiz Ghazi
- Kedah:
  - Sultan of Kedah: Sultan Sallehuddin
  - Menteri Besar of Kedah: Muhammad Sanusi Md Nor
- Kelantan:
  - Sultan of Kelantan: Sultan Muhammad V
  - Menteri Besar of Kelantan: Mohd Nassuruddin Daud
- Perlis:
  - Raja of Perlis: Tuanku Syed Sirajuddin
  - Menteri Besar of Perlis: Abu Bakar Hamzah
- Perak:
  - Sultan of Perak: Sultan Nazrin Muizzuddin Shah
  - Menteri Besar of Perak: Saarani Mohammad
- Pahang:
  - Sultan of Pahang: Al-Sultan Abdullah Ri'ayatuddin Al-Mustafa Billah Shah
  - Menteri Besar of Pahang: Wan Rosdy Wan Ismail
- Selangor:
  - Sultan of Selangor: Sultan Sharafuddin Idris Shah
  - Menteri Besar of Selangor: Amirudin Shari
- Terengganu:
  - Sultan of Terengganu: Sultan Mizan Zainal Abidin
  - Menteri Besar of Terengganu: Ahmad Samsuri Mokhtar
- Negeri Sembilan:
  - Yang di-Pertuan Besar of Negeri Sembilan: Tuanku Muhriz
  - Menteri Besar of Negeri Sembilan:
    - Aminuddin Harun (until 1 August)
    - Ismail Lasim (from 2 August)
- Penang:
  - Governor of Penang: Tun Ramli Ngah Talib
  - Chief Minister of Penang: Chow Kon Yeow
- Malacca:
  - Governor of Malacca: Tun Mohd Ali Rustam
  - Chief Minister of Malacca: Ab Rauf Yusoh
- Sarawak:
  - Governor of Sarawak: Tun Wan Junaidi Tuanku Jaafar
  - Premier of Sarawak: Amar Abang Johari Abang Openg
- Sabah:
  - Governor of Sabah: Tun Musa Aman
  - Chief Minister of Sabah: Hajiji Noor

== Events ==
=== January ===
- 1 January – The Online Safety Act 2025 passes into law, extending the reach of the Malaysian Communications and Multimedia Commission (MCMC) over platforms with over 8 million users in Malaysia.
- 11 January – The government blocks access to Grok AI over its usage in generating sexualised images of women and children.
- 12 January – An air conditioning unit under maintenance explodes inside a cafeteria at HELP University, killing one person and injuring nine others.
- 14 January – A late-night fire engulfs four factories at the Olak Lempit Industrial Area in Banting, Kuala Langat, killing three people.
- 20–26 January – Malaysia at the 2025 ASEAN Para Games in Nakhon Ratchasima (Korat), Thailand.
- 22 January – The Malaysian Anti-Corruption Commission charges two former generals including former Chief of Army Muhammad Hafizuddeain Jantan and former Chief of Defence Force Mohd Nizam Jaffar with money laundering, abuse of power and criminal breach of trust following an investigation into alleged irregularities in defence procurement deals.
- 24 January – 2026 Kinabatangan and Lamag by-election.
- 28 January — The executive committee of the Football Association of Malaysia resigns amid accusations by FIFA that the former had forged citizenship documents to enable seven foreign-born athletes to play for the Malaysia national football team.
- 29 January – The Malaysian Maritime Enforcement Agency seizes 512 million ringgit ($129.9 million) in crude oil from two tankers conducting an illegal ship-to-ship transfer off the coast of Penang.

=== February ===
- 4 February – The Malaysian Anti-Corruption Commission issues a ban on the importation of electronic waste.
- 6–22 February – Malaysia at the 2026 Winter Olympics in Milan and Cortina d'Ampezzo, Italy.
- 16 February – The Malaysian Communications and Multimedia Commission (MCMC) formally withdraws a defamation case it filed in a Thai court against Australian journalist and Thai resident Murray Hunter over articles published on his Substack newsletter after reaching a settlement.
- 23 February – A magnitude 7.1 earthquake hits off the coast of Sabah.
- 25 February – The MCMC blocks the social media apps Grindr and Blued as part of a government crackdown on LGBTQ activities.

=== March ===
- 27 March – Prime Minister Anwar Ibrahim confirms that Iran has allowed Malaysian oil tankers to pass through the Strait of Hormuz during the ongoing Iran war.

=== April ===
- 1 April – The Malaysian government withdraws its appeal against the Kuala Lumpur High Court's decision to grant Pastor Raymond Koh's family access to a classified report.
- 16 April – Prime Minister Anwar Ibrahim and Australian Prime Minister Anthony Albanese sign a mutual energy agreement with Malaysian oil and gas company Petronas agreeing to supply fuel to Australia in return for Australia prioritising its liquefied natural gas exports to Malaysia.
- 17 April – The Malaysian Maritime Enforcement Agency intercepts a boat carrying 25 migrants from Myanmar in Penang.
- 19 April
  - A farmer opens fire in front of a restaurant in Kota Tinggi, Johor, killing three people.
  - A fire at a coastal kampung in Sandakan District, Sabah, destroys around 1,000 houses and displaces 9,000 people.
- 22–30 April – Malaysia at the 2026 Asian Beach Games in Sanya, China.

=== May ===
- 11 May – A boat carrying migrants from Indonesia capsizes off Pangkor Island in Perak, leaving 14 passengers missing and 23 rescued.
- 15 May – Prime Minister Anwar Ibrahim announces that the Malaysian Cabinet will create a new pathway for graduates from Chinese independent high schools to enrol in Malaysian public universities. Students will still be required to pass the Malay language and history subjects at the Sijil Pelajaran Malaysia (SPM) level.
- 24 May – Police arrest 51 men (including 28 foreigners) in connection with a drug-fuelled "gay party" held at a Kuala Lumpur hotel. They also seize RM 103,070 (US$ 26,021) worth of illicit drugs including MDMA, ecstasy and ketamine.

=== June ===
- 1 June
  - The Malaysian Communications and Multimedia Commission gives social media users under the age of 16 six months to download or transfer their social media data before the Online Safety Act 2025's age verification comes into effect in December 2026.
  - The Johor State Legislative Assembly is dissolved in anticipation of the 2026 Johor state election.
  - A car collides with five other vehicles in Simpang Renggam near Kluang, Johor, killing five people.
- 5 June – The Negeri Sembilan State Legislative Assembly is dissolved in anticipation of the 2026 Negeri Sembilan state election.
- 7 June – An SUV collides with a lorry in Sungai Petani, Kedah, killing six people including an infant.
- 12 June – More than 1,000 Orang Asli from 19 tribes and communities join a rally in Putrajaya, Malaysia demanding for the recognition of their ancestral land and an end of evictions of the Orang Asli for land development.

=== July ===
- 11 July – Barisan Nasional wins a landslide victory during the 2026 Johor state election.
- 23 July – 8 August – Malaysia at the 2026 Commonwealth Games in Glasgow, Scotland.
- 24 July
  - The United States imposes a 10% tariff on Malaysia, citing the presence of alleged forced labour in the supply chain.
  - The United States Department of State summons Malaysia's Ambassador to the United States, Muhammad Shahrul Ikram Yaakob, over Malaysia's policy of banning Israelis from entering the country.
- 27 July – More than 100 Rohingya refugees are detained by authorities near the UNHCR office in Kuala Lumpur after attempted to seek assistance and being evicted by locals in Penang. The refugees are later released by authorities and sent to various locations in the country with the assistance of the UNHCR and NGOs.
- 29 July – After negotiations between the two countries, Prime Minister Anwar Ibrahim announces that Myanmar agreed to accept back around 5,000 Rohingya refugees residing in Malaysia.

=== August ===
- 1 August – An electoral pact consisting Barisan Nasional and Perikatan Nasional win a majority of seats in the Negeri Sembilan State Legislative Assembly during the 2026 Negeri Sembilan state election.
- 7 August – A container believed to be undergoing transit to Israel is seized by the Malaysia Border Control and Protection Agency (MCBA) at the Port of Tanjung Pelepas in Iskandar Puteri, Johor.
- 10 August – 2026 Southeast Asian haze: Several outdoor activities and events in Kuching, Samarahan, and the Serian Division are postponed or delayed due to the ongoing haze season in Sarawak.
- 12 August – 2026 Southeast Asian haze: The Sarawak government closes 108 schools in Serian area after the air pollutant index (API) exceeded over 200.
- 15–24 August – 2026 Sukma Games in Selangor.
- 27 August – Former prime minister Ismail Sabri Yaakob is charged with failure to provide a complete declaration of his assets.

=== September ===
- 3 September – A student from UiTM Jengka in Maran, Pahang dies due to heat-related symptoms and eight others are hospitalised following an endurance challenge in the campus.
- 4 September – 2026 Southeast Asian haze: A state of emergency is declared in Serian after the AQI reaches over 500.
- 5–10 September – 2026 Para Sukma Games in Selangor.
- 8 September – Five people are killed in a helicopter crash in Sarawak.
- 19 September – 4 October – Malaysia at the 2026 Asian Games in Aichi Prefecture and Nagoya, Japan.
- 23 September – The Malacca State Legislative Assembly is dissolved in anticipation of the 2026 Malacca state election.
- 29 September – Malaysia begins the repatriation of 5,000 Rohingya refugees to Myanmar.

=== October ===
- 3–10 October – Inaugural Asia Pacific Deaf Multi-Sports Championships in Penang.
- 9 October – 2026 Southeast Asian haze: Heavy haze from Indonesia leads to the closure of schools across the federal territories of Kuala Lumpur and Putrajaya, and the states of Selangor, Negeri Sembilan, Malacca, Johor and Pahang.
- 17 October – Israeli chess players announce that they were not allowed to compete in the World Amateur Chess Championship in Malaysia due to the country's immigration policy.
- 18–24 October – Malaysia at the 2026 Asian Para Games in Aichi Prefecture and Nagoya, Japan.
- 20 October – The Malaysian Government orders civil servants to stop using the Israeli navigation app Waze due to data security and privacy concerns arising from it being subject to Israeli laws.
- 21 October – An axe attack at a school in Kuching, Sarawak, leaves a teacher injured and results in the arrest of a 16-year-old student.
- 31 October – 13 November – Malaysia at the 2026 Summer Youth Olympics in Dakar, Senegal.

=== November ===
- 10 November – Former prime minister Mohammad Najib Abdul Razak is transferred to serve a two-year house arrest in Kuala Lumpur, Malaysia as part of a conditional pardon following his conviction over the 1MDB scandal.
- 14 November – 2026 Malacca state election.

=== December ===
- 12–19 December – 2026 ASEAN University Games in Kuala Lumpur, Malaysia.
- 13 December – 2026 Penang Bridge International Marathon at Sultan Abdul Halim Muadzam Shah Bridge.
- 14 December – 2026 Sarawak state election

== National Day and Malaysia Day ==
=== Theme ===
Malaysia MADANI: Kesejahteraan Dinikmati (Civilised Malaysia: Shared Prosperity)

=== National Day parade ===
Putrajaya International Convention Centre, Putrajaya and Putrajaya Square, Persiaran Perdana, Putrajaya

=== Malaysia Day celebration ===
Borneo Convention Centre Kuching (BCCK), Kuching, Sarawak

== Deaths ==
=== January ===
- 9 January – Wang Choon Wing, Former Member of Parliament (MP) for Lipis, Pahang.
- 26 January – Tan Yee Khan, Badminton player.

=== February ===
- 2 February – Koon Yew Yin, Co-founder of Gamuda Bhd and IJM Corp Bhd.
- 8 February – Along Eyzendy, Actor.
- 19 February – Abdul Hamid Mohamad, 5th Chief Justice of Malaysia (2007–2008).

=== March ===
- 11 March – Marina Yusof, Politician.
- 13 March – Siti Norma Yaakob, 6th Chief Justice of Malaya.
- 28 March – Yu Chin Liik, Sarawakian politician.
- 30 March – Lim Guan Teik, Founder of Muda Holdings and a pioneering figure in Malaysia's paper industry.

=== April ===
- 4 April – Ling Liong Sik, 6th President of the Malaysian Chinese Association and Minister of Transport.
- 10 April – Mohd Hashim Abdullah, 8th Chairman of the Election Commission.
- 19 April – Lau Cheng Kiong, President of the Sibu Chinese Chamber of Commerce and Industry and prominent businessman.
- 23 April – Tajang Laing, Orang Ulu politician, Former Member of the Cobbold Commission, Sarawak State Legislative Assembly (MLA) for Belaga.

=== May ===
- 13 May – Teh Kew San, Badminton Champion.
- 31 May – Yazid Baba, Former Member of the Negeri Sembilan State Legislative Assembly (MLA) for Terentang, Negeri Sembilan.

=== June ===
- 7 June – Mohd Jamil Md Idross, Former Member of the Kedah State Legislative Assembly (MLA) for Pengkalan Kundor, Kedah.

=== July ===
- 9 July – Ramzi Ab Rahman, Former Member of the Kelantan State Legislative Assembly (MLA) for Dabong, Kelantan.
- 10 July – Che Min Che Ahmad, Former Member of Parliament (MP) for Pasir Puteh.

=== August ===
- 5 August – Kamarool Haji Yusoff, Actor.
- 7 August – Mohamed Eusoff Chin, 2nd Chief Justice of Malaysia (1994–2000).
- 29 August – Wan Omar Wan Majid, Former MP for Pasir Puteh, Kelantan.
- 30 August – Tok Teng Sai, Former Member of the Terengganu State Executive Council and former Member of the Terengganu State Legislative Assembly (MLA) for Bandar, Terengganu.

=== September ===
- 20 September – Karim Bujang, Former Member of the Sabah State Legislative Assembly (MLA) for Bongawan, Sabah.
- 21 September – Yahya Lampong, Former Deputy Minister and Former MP for Kota Belud.
- 22 September
  - Yap Sin Tian, Former Chairman of the United Chinese School Committees' Association of Malaysia (Dong Zong).
  - Abdul Rahim Pachee, Former Member of the Penang State Legislative Assembly (MLA) for Telok Bahang, Penang.
- 24 September – L. Krishnan, Indian-born film director and screenwriter (Bakti).
- 28 September
  - Siti Hasmah, Civil servant, Spouse of 4th and 7th Prime Minister Mahathir Mohamad (1981–2003; 2018–2020) and chancellor of Multimedia University (1997–2012).
  - Jimmy Lim, Architect (Salinger House).

=== October ===
- 12 October
  - Roslee Daud, Former Member of the Terengganu State Legislative Assembly (MLA) for Bukit Besi, Terengganu.
  - Nurul Ashikin Mabahwi, Former Pejuang women’s youth chief.
- 26 October – Mahadev Shankar, 94, lawyer and judge.
- 31 October – Wan Badariah Wan Saad, former Member of the Perlis State Executive Council and member of the Perlis State Legislative Assembly (MLA) for Mata Ayer, Perlis.

=== November ===
- 8 November – Cico Harahap, 48, actor (Puteri Impian).
- 22 November – Abdul Halim Abdul Samad, former Deputy Persident of Dewan Negara.

== See also ==
- 2026
- 2025 in Malaysia
- 2027 in Malaysia
- History of Malaysia
