= Mahathir (name) =

Mahathir or Mahdzir (محاضر) can be a given name, a middle name, or a patronymic. Notable people with the name include:

== Given name ==
- Mahathir Azeman (born 1996), Singaporean football midfielder
- Mahdzir Khalid (born 1960), Malaysian politician and teacher
- Mahathir Mohamad (born 1925), Malaysian politician

== Middle name ==
- Azrul Mahathir Aziz, Malaysian politician

== Patronymic ==
- Marina Mahathir, Malaysian activist and writer
- Mokhzani Mahathir, Malaysian businessman
- Mukhriz Mahathir, Malaysian politician and businessman
- Zara Qairina Mahathir (died 2025), Malaysian secondary school student

== See also ==
- Mahathero in Bengali
