= 2025 Putra Heights pipeline fire =

Gas pipeline explosion in Selangor, Malaysia

- Putra Heights during the pipeline explosion in the morning of 1 April.
- Date: 1 April 2025
- Time: 8:08 am (MST)
- Duration: 7 hours 35 minutes
- Location: Putra Heights, Subang Jaya, Selangor, Malaysia; 3.005913°N 101.582601°E
- Type: Natural gas pipeline leak
- Deaths: None
- Injuries: 150
- Property damage: 237 houses and 399 vehicles
- Displaced: 538

On 1 April 2025 at around 8:08 am, a major industrial incident occurred in Putra Heights, Subang Jaya, Selangor, Malaysia, when a Petronas gas pipeline leak triggered an explosion and subsequent fire. The blaze produced flames as high as 30 metres (98 feet). A total of 150 people were injured, and emergency evacuations were conducted within a 290 metres (950 feet) radius of the site.

== Incident ==
Initial mushroom cloud explosion

At 8:08 am local time on 1 April 2025, an explosion occurred at the Petronas-owned Peninsula Gas Utilisation underground gas pipeline between gate valve 210 and gate valve 211 in Putra Heights, resulting in a large mushroom cloud in a residential area around Jalan Putra Harmoni. Flames reached 30 metres (98 feet), and temperatures reached over 1,000 °C (1,830 °F). They were visible from several kilometres away, with videos of the conflagration quickly circulating across social media platforms.

Eyewitness accounts documented extensive property damage, including structural damage to homes and vehicles. At least 49 houses were impacted by the fire.

The explosion and ensuing flames shook the ground and rocked resident's houses, which was felt up to 1.5 km (0.93 mi) from the epicentre. Residents said the roaring flame sounded like tremors or a hurricane, while others described the sound as an airplane turbine, or an airplane flying over their house. Debris from the explosion crashed through the roof of one resident's house and hit her leg.

Intense heat generated by the roaring flame, melted cars, motorcycles, plastic pipes, water tanks, CCTV camera, PVC wires, and other fixtures in nearby houses. Surrounding objects heated up rapidly after the blast, making it difficult for residents to retrieve their belongings. One resident who attempted to save his motorcycle said his skin stuck to the metal upon contact, resulting in burns to his hands.

The asphalt road in the immediate vicinity was also heated up to the point that escaping residents found their rubber slippers and flip-flops melted away in the process. An elderly woman suffered burns on her legs while running barefoot, and had to be dragged to safety by her children. A man also witnessed his car's side mirror melting away as he drove away from the scene. Many victims within a few hundred metres radius from the fire suffered second- to third-degree burns while escaping, with some receiving first- or fourth-degree burns.

Several residents from Kampung Kuala Sungai Baru fled into the nearby Klang River to escape the intense heat. Some swam across the river to safety, and were rescued by on the other side.

The explosion also caused power outages in Putra Heights and Subang Jaya, which prompted Tenaga Nasional Berhad (TNB) to deploy its technical team to the area to carry out repair works. Electricity to the Subang Jaya area was fully restored by 10:22 am, while power supply to affected areas in Putra Heights remained cut off since 4 pm to carry out cable inspection works.

Aerial view of the crater formed by the explosion with burnt down houses at the background

The fire from the burst pipeline persisted for approximately seven hours and was fully extinguished by 3:45 pm. The explosion formed a crater which measured approximately 21 m by 24 m (69 ft by 79 ft) with a depth of 9.8 m (32 feet).

== Impact ==
=== Injuries ===
The incident resulted in 150 injuries. The injured included 13 in the red zone, 55 in the yellow zone and 43 in the green zone, (Note: The red zone is for critical cases, while yellow zone is for semi-critical cases, and green zone is for non-critical cases.) with victims suffering from burns, smoke inhalation, respiratory difficulties, and other physical trauma. Of the injured, 67 required hospitalisation for more serious conditions, while 49 received treatment at a temporary medical base. 132 victims sought treatment at government and private hospitals. No deaths were reported.

One victim sustained burns on his left leg when the ceiling of his house collapsed and crushed his vehicle, while another suffered foot injuries while attempting to escape the intense heat. Several residential properties in proximity to the pipeline caught fire during the fire.

On 1 April, Health Minister Dzulkefly Ahmad said that no victims were being treated in intensive care units (ICU). On 2 April the Ministry of Health reported three victims in total were admitted into the ICU: one at Cyberjaya Hospital (later transferred to Kuala Lumpur Hospital), one at Ampang Hospital, and one at Sunway Medical Centre. (Note: The news reports on 2 April and 3 April by New Straits Times are contradicting each other on the number of ICU patients at Cyberjaya Hospital, the former said there are three ICU patients while the later said there is only one ICU patient at Cyberjaya Hospital. The later (news on 3 April) is taken as the correct number until proven otherwise by other reliable sources.) On 3 April, only one patient remained in the ICU.

=== Environment ===
Sand, dust and fine gravel from the explosion fell on roofs and cars of residents up to 10 km (6.2 mi) away. Many residents uploaded photos and videos to social media showing vehicles and areas near their homes showered with sand and fine gravel.

No toxic gas or abnormal air pollution index (API) readings were detected in the surrounding areas following the incident according to the Department of Environment.

=== Displacement ===
At least 538 people were displaced by the explosion, with most being housed at the multi-purpose hall of Putra Heights Mosque or the Dewan Camelia of Subang Jaya City Council (MBSJ).

=== Property damage ===
As of 7 April, 437 houses within 325 m radius from the epicentre were inspected by the fire department, and were divided into the following categories:

1. Completely destroyed (more than 40% damage): 81
2. Partially destroyed (less than 40% damage): 81
3. Affected but not burnt down: 57
4. Unaffected: 218

Out of all the houses inspected, 151 houses were declared safe to be inhabited on 7 April. On 8 April, the number of houses deemed safe rosed to 270.

The total value of losses and damage to residential properties caused by the fire is estimated to be at RM65.4 million.

Out of 571 vehicles inspected, 88 vehicles suffered more than 50% damage, while 332 vehicles suffered less than 50% damage. The rest of the 151 vehicles were not affected.

=== Gas supply disruption ===
On 2 April, Gas Malaysia announced gas supply curtailment to their customers in Shah Alam, Kundang, Petaling Jaya, Teluk Panglima Garang, Port Klang, Pulau Indah, and other areas. On 5 April, the gas supply company said the curtailment period was extended until 20 April. On 7 April, the gas supply curtailment area were expanded to Merbau, Tronoh, Perai, Junjung and Hutan Melintang due to "operational limitations", but the curtailment period will remained unchanged. Around 7% of the total volume of natural gas supplied by Gas Malaysia was affected by the fire.

On 3 April, The Italian Baker, the manufacturer of Massimo bread loaves, announced that its bread supply would be temporarily limited starting 4 April until further notice, due to a disruption in LNG supply to its factory following the gas pipeline fire in Putra Heights. Likewise, Malaysia Smelting Corporation, one of the world's largest tin producers, also informed customers that deliveries from its smelter in Port Klang had been disrupted, and it remained unclear when fuel supplies had resumed after the incident.

== Responses ==
=== Emergency response ===
Emergency services received initial notification about the fire at 8:10 am, with first responders quickly mobilising to the site. Selangor Fire and Rescue Department initiated rescue operations for trapped residents while simultaneously combating the fire. A total of 78 firefighters were deployed to help with the fire.

Petronas isolated the affected pipeline by remotely closing off gate valves at 8:51 am and 8:46 am. As a contingency measure, Petronas also closed off or released gas through additional valves. Officials noted that residual gas remaining within the pipeline would take at least four hours to clear out, either by burning up in the fire or being released through the valves.

As part of the emergency response, three nearby Petronas stations (Putra Heights, Putra Bestari, and KM2 LDP) were closed, though authorities confirmed these facilities were not directly affected by the fire. Officials clarified that only the main pipeline was involved in the incident, not the nearby Petronas petrol station as some initial reports had suggested.

Emergency medical services established a medical base at the Sri Maha Kaliamman Temple, where 49 victims received treatment, while an additional 63 individuals with more severe injuries were transported to nearby medical facilities. The Ministry of Health dispatched personnel to administer first aid at the temple location, with additional victim support provided by local mosque authorities.

As a precautionary measure, residents in the surrounding areas were evacuated, and a temporary relief center was established at Masjid Putra Heights. The Civil Aviation Authority of Malaysia also issued advisories requesting the public refrain from flying drones over the affected areas to avoid interference with emergency operations.

On 2 April, the police stated that 24-hour police patrols would be conducted in neighborhoods affected by the fire to ensure the safety of victims' property and belongings, and to prevent looting. District police chief Wan Azlan Wan Mamat also said the police will be patrolling together with the firefighters to ensure that no secondary fires develop.

=== Highway closure ===
At 12:07 pm on 1 April, PLUS Malaysia announced that all routes between Seafield and Bandar Saujana Putra on the ELITE Highway would be closed to all traffic for safety reasons. The closure was later lifted at 1:51 pm on the same day.

=== Animal care ===
During the incident, first responders saved two dogs, three rabbits, and a guinea pig from affected homes after the fire subsided. Some pet owners rushed back to their houses to rescue their pets upon learning about the fire, or escaped together upon waking up to the explosion. Many residents who were injured were also seen cradling their pets at the makeshift medical base at the Sri Maha Kaliamman Temple. A resident from Kampung Kuala Sungai Baru also claimed that seven cats owned by his sister died due to the intense heat generated by the fire. "The heat was really so great that pets that were not kept in the house died on the spot", he said.

Malaysian Animal Association, an animal welfare NGO, announced they will offer free pet care services for affected pet owners from 2 April until 8 April. On 2 April, the Stray Animal Association of Malaysia (SAFM) mobilised volunteers to rescue pets and stray animals in the affected area. The group collaborated with several veterinary clinics to provide free emergency treatment for animals suffering from burns or smoke inhalation, and distributed food to animals that lost their homes or caretakers.

On 2 April, volunteers found at least two cats that were trapped in affected houses and reunited them with their owners. A coordinated operation by Society for the Prevention of Cruelty to Animal (SPCA), SAFM, Animal Kindness Coalition (AKC), the fire department, and other NGOs resulted in the rescue of two snakes, a turtle, a fish, and a hamster, as well as cats and dogs.

=== Environment monitoring ===
On 1 April, the Department of Environment (DOE) deployed a team to the site to carry out preliminary air quality monitoring and assessment. The DOE also installed a CEREX gas detector at SK Putra Heights 2, located less than 2 km (1.2 miles) away from the incident site. As of 2 April, the DOE said no toxic gas had been detected and the API readings at the surrounding monitoring stations remained normal. The department also increased enforcement and monitoring efforts via land and air with drones.

=== Financial assistance ===
==== Government ====
After a site visit on the day of the incident, Prime Minister Anwar Ibrahim announced immediate financial aid of RM5,000 to owners whose houses were completely destroyed, while RM2,500 would be given to victims whose houses were partially damaged. Anwar Ibrahim also said affected residents would be compensated by the federal government, Selangor state government and Petronas. He also announced that the government and Petronas would take full responsibility for restoring, fixing, and replacing affected residential units, but said it may a take a year or more to rebuild the houses.

Tenaga Nasional Berhad also offered 100% electricity bill rebates for victims whose houses were affected by the fire, including waivers of electricity reconnection charges and late payment charges.

On 2 April, the Ministry of Human Resources announced that Social Security Organisation (PERKESO) members impacted by the fire has been identified, and compensation payments under the invalidity scheme (Note: Invalidity scheme under PERKESO is an insurance to provide 24 hours coverage to employees who suffers from injuries or death due to any cause and is not related to his employment.) are currently being distributed. The ministry also urged affected PERKESO members to reach out to the organisation to determine whether they are eligible for permanent or temporary disablement benefits.

On 4 April, Minister of Digital Gobind Singh Deo announced that his ministry will provide 100 laptops, 100 smartphones, and 100 tablets to residents who lost their electronic devices in the fire. He said applications can be made through their respective members of Parliament or state assemblymen, including Kota Kemuning assemblyman S. Preakas. Five hundred powerbanks will also be given to evacuees by the Malaysia Digital Economy Corporation under his ministry.

The king of Malaysia, Sultan Ibrahim Iskandar of Johor, visited the site and later visited evacuees at temporary relief centres at Putra Heights Mosque gave out RM1,000 of assistance to each of 308 households affected by the fire through Yayasan Sultan Ibrahim Johor. Ibrahim was joined by Raja Muda of Selangor Tengku Amir Shah, the Menteri Besar of Selangor, and other government officials during the visit.

On 7 April, the Menteri Besar of Selangor Amirudin Shari announced the state government will provide rental assistance of RM2,000 per month to each affected family for six months. The state government will also give RM500 to 265 students affected by the fire through Menteri Besar Selangor Incorporated.

He also revealed that owners whose houses were completely destroyed would receive RM10,000 aid in total, with RM5,000 from Petronas, and another RM5,000 from the federal government. Likewise, owners whose houses were partially damaged will receive RM5,000 in total, with the cost equally divided between Petronas and the federal government. Tenants whose rental houses were damaged will also enjoy the same compensation rate like the owners whose houses were partially damaged.

==== Corporate ====
Several automobile and used car companies pledged to provide or lend vehicles to victims who lost their cars in the fire, including 50 cars from Carsome, 50 SUVs from Chery, 30 cars from Carro, 20 cars from GoCar, 62 cars from DRB-Hicom, 62 vehicles from YonMing, and 30 vehicles from Tan Chong Motor Holdings Bhd and Warisan TH Holdings Bhd. Sixty-three motorcycles will be provided by an unnamed company as well.

The first batch of 25 cars from Chery was delivered to the victims on 4 April, with the remaining 25 cars expected to be handed over as early as 7 April. On 5 April, 30 cars from Carro were distributed to the victims. 20 cars from Carsome were also delivered in the same day, with the remaining 30 cars expected to arrive by the next week.

Spanco also on 8 April sponsored 55 motorcycles to the victims, with the cost of insurance, vehicle ownership certificate registration fee, and road tax fully covered as well. Majority of the recipients are Kampung Kuala Sungai Baru residents.

Three hundred families each received RM3,000 cash donations from Vincent Tan through Berjaya Cares Foundation, while another 100 families received RM3,000 from Matrix Concepts Holdings.

Chery also donated RM50,000 to the management of Putra Heights Mosque, which housed one of the temporary relief centres, to pay its utilities.

Panasonic also provided 240 families with RM500 e-vouchers to replace their electrical appliances lost in the fire, which will remain valid until 31 December.

== Investigation ==
Minister of Housing and Local Government Nga Kor Ming acknowledged receiving official reports from the Selangor Fire and Rescue Department regarding the incident and stated that a comprehensive investigation would be carried out to determine the cause and circumstances of the pipeline failure. He confirmed that the department had been instructed to proceed with standard investigative protocols.

Menteri Besar of Selangor Amirudin Shari announced that the initial report on the fire was expected to be completed within 72 hours.

On 5 April, journalists from China Press observed that a vehicle-mounted Leica mobile mapping system had been deployed to the scene by authorities.

== See also ==
- List of pipeline accidents
