= Ishsam Shahruddin =

Malaysian politician, footballer, businessman and contractor (1966–2025)

Ishsam Shahruddin PMP PPT
- عصام شهرالدين

Member of the Perak State Legislative Assembly for Ayer Kuning
- In office 19 November 2022 – 22 February 2025
- Preceded by: Samsudin Abu Hassan (BN–UMNO)
- Succeeded by: Mohamad Yusri Bakir (BN–UMNO)
- Majority: 2,213 (2022)

Personal details
- Born: Ishsam bin Shahruddin; 31 August 1966 Sungkai, Perak, Malaysia
- Died: 22 February 2025 (aged 58) George Town, Penang, Malaysia
- Cause of death: Acute coronary syndrome (ACS)
- Resting place: Rapat Setia Muslim Cemetery, Ipoh, Perak, Malaysia
- Party: United Malays National Organisation (UMNO)
- Other political affiliations: Barisan Nasional (BN)
- Spouse: Rozlita Abdullah
- Children: 4 (including Muhammad Iszul Imadi)
- Occupation: Politician; footballer; businessman; contractor
Association football career
- Position: Midfielder
Senior career*
Years	Team	Apps	(Gls)
1984–1990	Perak		
1991	Negeri Sembilan		
1992–1997	Perak		
International career
1987	Malaysia		
- * Club domestic league appearances and goals

Ishsam bin Shahruddin (31 August 1966 – 22 February 2025) was a Malaysian politician, footballer, businessman and contractor who served as Member of the Perak State Legislative Assembly (MLA) for Ayer Kuning from November 2022 to his death in office in February 2025. He was a member of the United Malays National Organisation (UMNO), a component party of the Barisan Nasional (BN) coalition. He was also the Division Chief of BN and UMNO of Tapah, having served from 2018 until his untimely death in office. He is the shortest-serving Ayer Kuning MLA, in office for slightly over two years and three months.

== Club career ==
During most of his football career, Ishsam played with Perak FA, save for one season with Negeri Sembilan FA. With Perak, Ishsam won the first ever Malaysia FA Cup in 1990.

After retiring from football, Ishsam became a politician, businessman and contractor. Ishsam later returned to the Perak FA as its Vice-President and Team Assistant Manager. Ishsam was also the Under-23-Year-Old Team Manager of Perak FA for the President Cup.

== International career ==
Ishsam played for Malaysia in 1987.

== Death ==
On 22 February 2025, Ishsam collapsed and became unconscious at 5.20 pm at City Stadium in Georgetown, Penang. He was resting after participating in a Chief Minister of Penang's Football Cup four-cornered friendly match against Kedah Darul Aman F.C. for 25 minutes, shaking hands and greeting other players at the sidelines. He was then rushed to the Penang General Hospital (HPP) for emergency treatment but was pronounced dead slightly over an hour later at 6.28 pm. His body was then taken away from the HPP Forensic Medicine Department after completing autopsy and post-mortem to his residence in Desa Seri Ampang, Ipoh, Perak to be bathed and shrouded before being buried at the Rapat Setia Muslim Cemetery, Ipoh, Perak at 10 am the following day, 23 February 2025. His cause of death was later confirmed to be acute coronary syndrome (ACS). Following his death, the Ayer Kuning by-election was held on 26 April 2025, to elect the new Ayer Kuning MLA as his successor. Mohamad Yusri Bakir, the Division Secretary of BN and UMNO of Tapah, won the seat and was elected by defeating Abdul Muhaimin Malek of Perikatan Nasional (PN) and Bawani Kaniapan of the Socialist Party of Malaysia (PSM) by a majority of 5,006 votes in the election.

== Election results ==
Perak State Legislative Assembly
Year	Constituency	Candidate	Votes	Pct	Opponent(s)	Votes	Pct	Ballots cast	Majority	Turnout
2022	N48 Ayer Kuning	Ishsam Shahruddin (UMNO)	9,088	38.73%	Mohd Nazri Hashim (AMANAH)	6,875	29.30%	23,906	2,213	74.85%
2022	N48 Ayer Kuning	Ishsam Shahruddin (UMNO)	9,088	38.73%	Muhamamd Noor Farid Zainal (PAS)	6,812	29.03%	23,906	2,213	74.85%
2022	N48 Ayer Kuning	Ishsam Shahruddin (UMNO)	9,088	38.73%	Bawani Kaniapan (PSM)	586	2.50%	23,906	2,213	74.85%
2022	N48 Ayer Kuning	Ishsam Shahruddin (UMNO)	9,088	38.73%	Maziah Salim (PEJUANG)	105	0.45%	23,906	2,213	74.85%

== Honours ==
- Perak
  - Commander of the Order of the Perak State Crown (PMP) (2025; posthumously)
  - Recipient of the Distinguished Conduct Medal (PPT) (2004)
