= Wei-Ling Gallery =

Art gallery in Kuala Lumpur, Malaysia

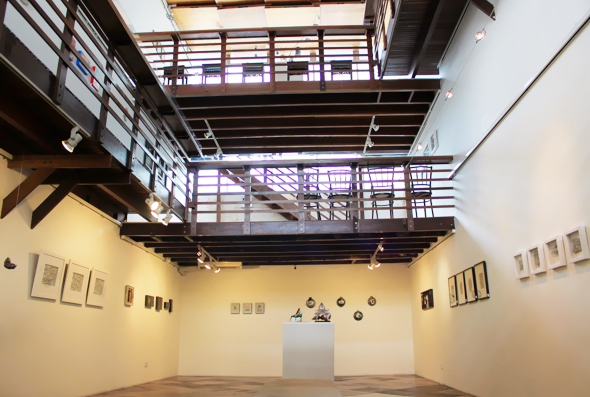
- Established: 2002
- Location: Brickfields, Kuala Lumpur, Malaysia
- Type: Art gallery
- Director: Lim Wei-Ling

Wei-Ling Gallery is a contemporary art gallery in Kuala Lumpur, Malaysia, founded in 2002 by Lim Wei-Ling. It is committed to the development of contemporary art in Malaysia, encourages passion for art, and supports the next generation of young emerging artists. The gallery has published over 121 art publications in Malaysia, which include exhibition catalogues, brochures, and artists' books.

== Overview and artists ==
The gallery focuses on contemporary art, with a specific focus on Malaysian art and culture. Through different programs and exhibitions each month, works are made by Malaysia's contemporary artists. It also represents internationally acclaimed artists such as Pakistani sculptor Amin Gulgee, Rome-based conceptual artist H. H. Lim, information artist and bio-hacker Heather Dewey-Hagborg, surrealist photographer Roger Ballen, prolific painter Paresh Maity, Kurdish conceptual artist Ahmet Öğüt, London based visual artist and writer James Bridle, conceptual artist Paolo Cirio, Dadang Christanto, global agitator Anida Yoeu Ali, and German photographer Viktoria Binschtok.

Over the last two decades, Wei-Ling Gallery has held more than 232 exhibitions at its galleries in Malaysia and at exhibition spaces abroad. The Malaysian maestros of the arts scene that are represented by the gallery are Anurendra Jegadeva, Chen Wei Meng, Cheng Yen Pheng, Cheong Kiet Cheng, Chin Kong Yee, Choy Chun Wei, Hamidi Hadi, Ivan Lam, Norma Abbas, Rajinder Singh, Sean Lean, Wong Chee Meng, and Yau Bee Ling.

== International recognition ==
Since 2006, Wei-Ling Gallery has been actively promoting Malaysian contemporary art on the international stage. Wei-Ling Gallery is the first Malaysian gallery that brought international spotlight to all of its represented artists. The gallery has since taken exhibitions to Pakistan, India, China, Hong Kong, Taiwan and Singapore. They also regularly participate in international art fairs such as Art Basel Hong Kong, Art Stage Singapore, Art Taipei, Art Jakarta, China International Gallery Exposition Beijing (CIGE),, Korean International Art Fair (KIAF), and ART SG. Wei-Ling Gallery and Malaysian contemporary artist Ivan Lam made their debut at Volta New York.

== BIENNALE ARTE 2019 ==
Malaysia's inaugural national pavilion at the 58th International Art Exhibition of La Biennale in Venezia, Italy, in 2019 was curated by Lim Wei-Ling. The pavilion was commissioned by both the National Gallery of Malaysia and the Ministry of Tourism, Arts and Culture, featuring Anurendra Jegadeva, H.H.Lim, Ivan Lam and Zulkifli Yusoff.

== WLG Incubator ==
The WLG Incubator Mentorship Program was launched in 2020.

WLG Incubator Young Artists Show 2025 : Iwadh Mahadi

WLG Incubator Young Artists Show 2024 : Lee Mok Yee and Ryan Naga

WLG Incubator Young Artists Show 2023 : Alicia Lau and Khabir Roslan

WLG Incubator Young Artists Show 2021 : Alya Hatta, Anwar Suhaimi and Shika

WLG Incubator Young Artists Show 2020 : Anas Afandi and Tang Tze Lye

== Philanthropy and corporate collaboration ==
The gallery has worked closely with a number of corporations, including HSBC, United Overseas Bank (UOB), Hong Leong Bank, Nippon Paint, Bombay Sapphire, Glenmorangie, Royal Selangor, Allianz Insurance, Corum.

== Architecture ==
Located in a pre-war building in the suburb of Brickfields, this area is one of the oldest settlements in Kuala Lumpur and is home to many residences, commercial entities, and religious structures of different denominations. The building, known to be a historical heritage and architectural landmark, was razed in a fire in 2004. It was then reconstructed by Malaysian architect Jimmy Lim, to house both Jimmy Lim Design (JLD). and Wei-Ling Gallery
