= Bakti =

- Directed by: L. Krishnan
- Screenplay by: L. Krishnan
- Story by: S. Ramanathan
- Based on: Les Misérables
- Produced by: Run Run Shaw
- Starring: P. Ramlee; Kasma Booty; S. Roomai Noor; Siput Sarawak
- Music by: Osman Ahmad
- Production companies: Shaw Brothers Studio; Malay Film Productions
- Release date: 1 April 1950
- Countries: Malaysia, Singapore
- Language: Malay

Bakti (English: Faithfullness) is a 1950 Singaporean Malay black-and-white drama movie. Directed by L. Krishnan and produced by Run Run Shaw, it was adapted from Les Misérables. P. Ramlee starred in his first leading role, with Kasma Booty, S. Roomai Noor, and Siput Sarawak. The movie launched P. Ramlee's career and made him a major figure in Malay cinema for 20 years.

== Cast ==
- P. Ramlee as Nasir
- Kasma Booty as Sa'adiyah
- S. Roomai Noor as Hassan
- Siput Sarawak as Edah
- Yusof Banjar as Orang Kaya Ibrahim
- Siti Zainab

== Legacy and status ==
P. Ramlee named his son, Nasir P. Ramlee, after his character. With no surviving copies, Bakti is now considered a lost movie.

== Related pages ==
- P. Ramlee filmography
