= Mohamad Yusri Bakir =

Malaysian politician, lecturer, religious teacher and former teacher

Yang Berhormat Tuan Mohamad Yusri Bakir PMP MLA
- محمد يسري بكير

Member of the Perak State Legislative Assembly for Ayer Kuning
- Incumbent
- Assumed office 26 April 2025
- Preceded by: Ishsam Shahruddin (BN–UMNO)
- Majority: 5,006 (2025)

Personal details
- Born: Mohamad Yusri bin Bakir; 1971 (age 54–55) Ayer Kuning, Tapah, Perak, Malaysia
- Party: United Malays National Organisation (UMNO)
- Other political affiliations: Barisan Nasional (BN)
- Spouse: Rosnani Mahmud
- Children: 4
- Education: Sultan Idris Education University (PhD)
- Occupation: Politician
- Profession: Teacher

Mohamad Yusri bin Bakir (Jawi: محمد يوسري بن باكير; born 1971) is a Malaysian politician and teacher who has served as Member of the Perak State Legislative Assembly (MLA) for Ayer Kuning since April 2025. He is a member of the United Malays National Organisation (UMNO), a component party of the Barisan Nasional (BN) coalition. He has served as the Division Secretary of BN and UMNO of Tapah since 2020 and Branch Chief of UMNO of Kampung Sekolah since 2013. He served as the Division Information Chief of UMNO of Tapah from 2018 to 2020, Division Committee Member of Education Bureau of UMNO of Tapah in 2002 and 2008, Division Youth Committee Member of UMNO of Tapah from 2008 to 2013, Division Youth Chairman of Religious and Welfare Bureau of UMNO of Tapah from 2008 to 2013 and Deputy Branch Chief of UMNO of Kampung Sekolah from 2008 to 2013.

== Early life and education ==
Mohamad Yusri was born in Ayer Kuning, Tapah, Perak, Malaysia in 1971. He graduated from the Sultan Idris Education University (UPSI) with a Doctor of Philosophy (PhD) in Islamic education in 2017.

== Early career ==
Mohamad Yusri served as a teacher at Toh Tandewa Sakti National School Tapah from 1992 to 2005, Batu Tiga National School Temoh from 2006 to 2007 as well as a lecturer, a Grade DG52 excellent lecturer and Head of the Department of Islamic and Moral Education at the Institute of Teacher Education (IPG) Ipoh Campus since 2007, from 2020 to 2023 and since 2024 respectively.

Besides his career in education, Mohamad Yusri has also served as Member of the Tapah District Council (MDT) for Zone 10 of Pekan Temoh from 2023 to 2026, Chairman of the Parent–Teacher Association (PTA) of Izzuddin Shah Ipoh School from 2019 to 2024, Chairman of the Board of Directors of Islamic Education Teachers’ Cooperative of Perak Berhad since 2022, Secretary of the Board of Directors of Kampung Temoh Industry Cooperative of Perak Berhad since 2015, Chairman of the Children’s Education Organisation of Tapah since 2021, Secretary of the Community Development Department (KEMAS) Kindergarten Committee (TBK) of Kampung Raja Temoh from 1996 to 2005, Vice Chairman of Kampung Raja TBK from 2006 to 2008, Chairman of Kampung Raja Temoh TBK from 2008 to 2012, Treasurer of Surau Kampung Raja Temoh from 1997 to 2003, Treasurer of the Youth Council of MDT from 1999 to 2002, Secretary of the Youth Council of MDT from 2010 to 2012, Chairman of Kampung Batu Masjid Youth 4B Branch from 2008 to 2012, Information Chief of the Tapah Youth 4B Area from 2009 to 2012, President of the Supporters of Religious Secondary School Tapah Branch from 2003 to 2007, Member of the Village Development and Security Committee (JKKK) of Kampung Batu Masjid from 2006 to 2010, Member of the JKKK of Kampung Ayer Semambu from 2015 to 2018, Secretary of the Kampung Batu Masjid Mosque in 2010, Vice President of the PTA of Batu Masjid National School from 2010 to 2012, President of Batu Masjid Temoh National School PTA from 2012 to 2015, Secretary of the Alumni of Izzuddin & TAAyah Religious Secondary School (SISTA) from 2010 to 2017 and Committee Member of the Chenderiang National Secondary School PTA from 2015 to 2023.

== Political career ==
=== Member of the Perak State Legislative Assembly (since 2025) ===
==== 2025 Ayer Kuning by-election ====
In the 2025 Ayer Kuning by-election, called due to the death in office of its MLA Ishsam Shahruddin on 22 February 2025, Mohamad Yusri made his electoral debut after being nominated by BN to contest for the Ayer Kuning state seat. Mohamad Yusri won the seat after defeating Abdul Muhaimin Malek of Perikatan Nasional (PN) who was also a religious teacher and the Division Commissioner of the Malaysian Islamic Party (PAS) of Tapah and lawyer Bawani Kaniapan of the Socialist Party of Malaysia (PSM) by a majority of 5,006 votes. On the nomination day on 12 April 2025, he promised to carry on the legacy of former Ayer Kuning MLA Ishsam, especially his plans in education, the field he worked in and described as foundation in developing an educated and high-quality society. He also expressed hope that the combination of BN and Pakatan Harapan (PH) campaign machinery and team would make him the main choice for the Ayer Kuning voters.

== Personal life ==
Mohamad Yusri married Rosnani Mahmud (叶进双), who is a Chinese Hakka and Muslim. Rosnani was born in Kuantan, Pahang, Malaysia, she was adopted by a Malay family when she was young and she did not know her mother tongue Chinese. Rosnani was then brought to Sungai Buloh, Selangor, Malaysia where her biological family moved to by her adopted parents to meet her biological parents at the age of 12 and has frequently been in contact with her biological family since then. Rosnani has 11 siblings, she and her youngest sister 叶进吗 are a pair of twin. His mother-in-law is 李福娣 and eldest sister-in-law is 叶进玉. The couple has 4 children, 2 sons and 2 daughters, namely Amir Taufiq Mohamad Yusri, Amira Husna Mohamad Yusri, Amira Auni Mohamad Yusri and Amir Wazif Mohamad Yusri who were all born in 1990s and 2000s.

== Election results ==
Perak State Legislative Assembly
Year	Constituency	Candidate	Votes	Pct	Opponent(s)	Votes	Pct	Ballots cast	Majority	Turnout
2025	N48 Ayer Kuning	Mohamad Yusri Bakir (UMNO)	11,065	60.70%	Abdul Muhaimin Malek (PAS)	6,059	33.23%	18,230	5,006	58.07%
2025	N48 Ayer Kuning	Mohamad Yusri Bakir (UMNO)	11,065	60.70%	Bawani Kaniapan (PSM)	1,106	6.07%	18,230	5,006	58.07%

== Honours ==
- Perak
  - Commander of the Order of the Perak State Crown (PMP) (2025)
