= 2027 in Malaysia =

- Decades: 2000s; 2010s; 2020s
- See also: Other events of 2027; History of Malaysia • Timeline • Years

2027 in Malaysia is the 70th anniversary of Malaysia's Independence and 64th anniversary of its formation of Malaysia.

== Federal level ==
- Yang di-Pertuan Agong: Sultan Ibrahim of Johor
- Raja Permaisuri Agong: Raja Zarith Sofiah of Johor
- Deputy Yang di-Pertuan Agong: Sultan Nazrin Muizzuddin Shah of Perak
- Prime Minister: Anwar Ibrahim
- Deputy Prime Ministers: Ahmad Zahid Hamidi and Fadillah Yusof
- President of the Dewan Negara: Awang Bemee Awang Ali Basah
- Speaker of the Dewan Rakyat: Johari Abdul
- Chief Justice: Wan Ahmad Farid Wan Salleh

== State level ==
- Johor:
  - Sultan of Johor: Tunku Ismail Idris (Regent)
  - Menteri Besar of Johor: Onn Hafiz Ghazi
- Kedah:
  - Sultan of Kedah: Sultan Sallehuddin
  - Menteri Besar of Kedah: Muhammad Sanusi Md Nor
- Kelantan:
  - Sultan of Kelantan: Sultan Muhammad V
  - Menteri Besar of Kelantan: Mohd Nassuruddin Daud
- Perlis:
  - Raja of Perlis: Tuanku Syed Sirajuddin
  - Menteri Besar of Perlis: Abu Bakar Hamzah
- Perak:
  - Sultan of Perak: Sultan Nazrin Muizzuddin Shah
  - Menteri Besar of Perak: Saarani Mohammad
- Pahang:
  - Sultan of Pahang: Al-Sultan Abdullah Ri'ayatuddin Al-Mustafa Billah Shah
  - Menteri Besar of Pahang: Wan Rosdy Wan Ismail
- Selangor:
  - Sultan of Selangor: Sultan Sharafuddin Idris Shah
  - Menteri Besar of Selangor: Amirudin Shari
- Terengganu:
  - Sultan of Terengganu: Sultan Mizan Zainal Abidin
  - Menteri Besar of Terengganu: Ahmad Samsuri Mokhtar
- Negeri Sembilan:
  - Yang di-Pertuan Besar of Negeri Sembilan: Tuanku Muhriz
  - Menteri Besar of Negeri Sembilan: Ismail Lasim
- Penang:
  - Governor of Penang: Tun Ramli Ngah Talib
  - Chief Minister of Penang: Chow Kon Yeow
- Malacca:
  - Governor of Malacca: Tun Mohd Ali Rustam
  - Chief Minister of Malacca: Ab Rauf Yusoh
- Sarawak:
  - Governor of Sarawak: Tun Wan Junaidi Tuanku Jaafar
  - Premier of Sarawak: Amar Abang Johari Abang Openg
- Sabah:
  - Governor of Sabah: Tun Musa Aman
  - Chief Minister of Sabah: Hajiji Noor

== Events ==
=== Predicted and scheduled ===
- 18–29 September – 2027 SEA Games in Kuala Lumpur, Sarawak, Johor and Penang, Malaysia.
- 17–23 October – 2027 ASEAN Para Games in Kuala Lumpur, Malaysia.

== National Day and Malaysia Day ==
=== Theme ===
TBD

=== National Day parade ===
TBD

=== Malaysia Day celebration ===
TBD

== See also ==
- 2027
- 2026 in Malaysia | 2028 in Malaysia
- History in Malaysia
