= Tapah (federal constituency) =

Federal constituency in Perak, Malaysia

Tapah (P072)
Perak constituency

Federal constituency
- Legislature: Dewan Rakyat
- MP: Saravanan Murugan; BN
- Constituency created: 1984
- First contested: 1986
- Last contested: 2022

Demographics
- Population (2020): 79,093
- Electors (2022): 61,946
- Area (km²): 893
- Pop. density (per km²): 88.6

Tapah is a federal constituency in Batang Padang District and Hilir Perak District, Perak, Malaysia, that has been represented in the Dewan Rakyat since 1986.

The federal constituency was created in the 1984 redistribution and is mandated to return a single member to the Dewan Rakyat under the first past the post voting system.

== Demographics ==
Ethnic breakdown of Tapah's electorate as of 2022
1. Malay (45.6%)
2. Chinese (24.2%)
3. Other ethnicities (16.4%)
4. Indian (13.8%)

As of 2020, Tapah has a population of 79,093 people.

Age breakdown of Tapah's electorate as of 2022
1. 18–20 (5.23%)
2. 21–29 (20.0%)
3. 30–39 (22.6%)
4. 40–49 (16.7%)
5. 50–59 (14.4%)
6. 60–69 (11.8%)
7. 70–79 (6.02%)
8. 80–89 (2.48%)
9. above 90 (0.58%)
Gender breakdown of Tapah's electorate as of 2022
1. Male (50.3%)
2. Female (49.7%)

== History ==
=== Polling districts ===
According to the federal gazette issued on 31 October 2022, the Tapah constituency is divided into 37 polling districts.

State constituency	Polling Districts	Code	Location
Chenderiang (N47）	Kuala Woh	072/47/01	SK Bt. 14; SK Pos Musuh LZ
Chenderiang (N47）	Kampong Kinjang	072/47/02	SK Sri Kinjang
Chenderiang (N47）	Pekan Chenderiang	072/47/03	SK Chenderiang
Chenderiang (N47）	Sungai Chenderiang	072/47/04	SJK (C) Chenderiang
Chenderiang (N47）	Temoh	072/47/05	SJK (C) Hwa Min
Chenderiang (N47）	Pekan Temoh	072/47/06	SJK (C) Hwa Min
Chenderiang (N47）	Kampong Lubok Mas	072/47/07	SJK (C) Chenderiang
Chenderiang (N47）	Temoh Road	072/47/08	SK Satu
Chenderiang (N47）	Jalan Pahang	072/47/09	SK Datuk Kelana; SK Kampong Pahang
Chenderiang (N47）	Kampong Datoh	072/47/10	SRA Rakyat Al-Rahmaniah Kg. Datok
Chenderiang (N47）	Kampong Seberang	072/47/11	SK Satu
Chenderiang (N47）	Sungai Sengkuang	072/47/12	SJK (C) Kheung Wa
Chenderiang (N47）	Bidor Road	072/47/13	SJK (C) Kheung Wa
Chenderiang (N47）	Lubok Katak	072/47/14	SK Batu Melintang
Chenderiang (N47）	Kampong Batu Melintang	072/47/15	SK Batu Melintang
Chenderiang (N47）	Bukit Pagar	072/47/16	SJK (C) Bukit Pagar
Chenderiang (N47）	Tanah Mas	072/47/17	SJK (C) Tanah Mas
Ayer Kuning (N48)	Temoh Stesyen	072/48/01	SK Temoh
Ayer Kuning (N48)	Sungai Lesong	072/48/02	SK Sungai Lesong
Ayer Kuning (N48)	Kampong Sungai Kurong	072/48/03	SK Sungai Lesong
Ayer Kuning (N48)	Sungai Keroh	072/48/04	SJK (C) Sungai Kroh
Ayer Kuning (N48)	Kampong Batu Mesjid	072/48/05	SK Batu Masjid
Ayer Kuning (N48)	Kampung Batu Tiga	072/48/06	SK Batu Tiga
Ayer Kuning (N48)	Banir	072/48/07	SJK (C) Hwa Lian
Ayer Kuning (N48)	Banir Utara	072/48/08	SJK (C) Hwa Lian
Ayer Kuning (N48)	Ayer Kuning	072/48/09	SK Ayer Kuning
Ayer Kuning (N48)	Ayer Kuning Selatan	072/48/10	SJK (C) Pheng Lok
Ayer Kuning (N48)	Tanjong Keramat	072/48/11	SA Rakyat Salamiah Kampung Tanjung Keramat
Ayer Kuning (N48)	Changkat Petai	072/48/12	SK Haji Hasan
Ayer Kuning (N48)	Tapah Road Timor	072/48/13	SJK (C) Phui Chen
Ayer Kuning (N48)	Tapah Road Utara	072/48/14	SMK Dato' Panglima Perang Kiri
Ayer Kuning (N48)	Kampong Raya	072/48/15	SK Toh Tandewa Sakti
Ayer Kuning (N48)	Pekan Getah	072/48/16	SJK (C) Pekan Getah
Ayer Kuning (N48)	Kampong Simpang Tiga	072/48/17	SMK Bidor; SMA Daerah Batang Padang
Ayer Kuning (N48)	Kampong Rahmat	072/48/18	SJK (T) Ladang Banopdane
Ayer Kuning (N48)	Jeram Mengkuang	072/48/19	SK Jeram Mengkuang
Ayer Kuning (N48)	Kampong Coldstream	072/48/20	SJK (C) Kg Coldstream

=== Representation history ===
Members of Parliament for Tapah
Parliament	No	Years	Member	Party	Vote Share
Constituency created, renamed from Batang Padang
7th	P066	1986–1990	M. G. Pandithan (எம். ஜி. பண்டிதன்)	BN (MIC)	13,583; 59.40%
8th	P066	1990–1995	K. Kumaran (கே குமரன்)	BN (MIC)	15,015; 60.52%
9th	P069	1995–1999	K. Kumaran (கே குமரன்)	BN (MIC)	15,543; 64.47%
10th	P069	1999–2004	S. Veerasingam (எஸ்.வீரசிங்கம்)	BN (MIC)	14,945; 61.63%
11th	P072	2004–2008	S. Veerasingam (எஸ்.வீரசிங்கம்)	BN (MIC)	16,945; 69.72%
12th	P072	2008–2013	Saravanan Murugan (முருகன் சரவணன)	BN (MIC)	14,084; 56.00%
13th	P072	2013–2018	Saravanan Murugan (முருகன் சரவணன)	BN (MIC)	20,670; 57.73%
14th	P072	2018–2022	Saravanan Murugan (முருகன் சரவணன)	BN (MIC)	16,086; 44.47%
15th	P072	2022–present	Saravanan Murugan (முருகன் சரவணன)	BN (MIC)	18,398; 41.36%

=== State constituency ===
Parliamentary constituency	State constituency						
Parliamentary constituency	1955–1959*	1959–1974	1974–1986	1986–1995	1995–2004	2004–2018	2018–present
Tapah				Ayer Kuning			
Tapah				Chenderiang			

=== Historical boundaries ===
State Constituency	Area			
State Constituency	1984	1994	2003	2018
Ayer Kuning	Ayer Kuning; Kampung Makteh; Kampung Tanjung Keramat; Tapah Road; Temoh Station	Kampung Baru Coldstream; Kampung Tanjung Keramat; Kampung Tersusun Serentang Baru; Tapah Road; Temoh Station		
Chendering	Kampung Tersusun Serentang Baru; Kuala Dipang; Pos Woh; Sahom; Temoh	Chenderiang; Kuala Dipang; Pos Woh; Sahom; Temoh		Chenderiang; Kampung Kinjang; Pos Woh; Tapah; Temoh

=== Current state assembly members ===
No.	State Constituency	Member	Coalition (Party)
N47	Chenderiang	Choong Shin Heng	BN (MCA)
N48	Ayer Kuning	Mohamad Yusri Bakir	BN (UMNO)

=== Local governments & postcodes ===
No.	State Constituency	Local Government	Postcode
N47	Chenderiang	Tapah District Council	31910 Kampar; 31950 Mambang Di Awan; 35000 Tapah; 35300 Chenderiang; 35350 Temoh; 35400 Tapah Road; 35500 Bidor
N48	Ayer Kuning	Teluk Intan Municipal Council (Tanjong Keramat area); Tapah District Council	31910 Kampar; 31950 Mambang Di Awan; 35000 Tapah; 35300 Chenderiang; 35350 Temoh; 35400 Tapah Road; 35500 Bidor

== Election results ==
Malaysian general election, 2022
Party	Candidate	Votes	%	∆%
BN	Saravanan Murugan	18,398	41.36	▼3.11
PH	Saraswathy Kandasami	13,334	29.98	▲29.98
PN	Muhammad Yadzan Muhammad	12,115	27.24	▲27.24
PEJUANG	Mior Nor Haidir Suhaimi	335	0.75	▲0.75
Heritage	Mohamed Akbar Sherrif Ali Yasin	200	0.45	▲0.45
Independent	M Karthiravan	99	0.22	▲0.22
Total valid votes		44,481	100.00	
Total rejected ballots		966		
Unreturned ballots		90		
Turnout		45,537	71.81	▼6.94
Registered electors		61,946		
Majority		5,064	11.38	▲9.68
BN hold		Swing		
Source(s) https://lom.agc.gov.my/ilims/upload/portal/akta/outputp/1753277/PUB610%20PARLIMEN%20PERAK.pdf

Malaysian general election, 2018
Party	Candidate	Votes	%	∆%
BN	Saravanan Murugan	16,086	44.47	▼13.26
PKR	Mohamed Azni Mohamed Ali	15,472	42.77	▲7.18
PAS	Norazli Musa	4,616	12.76	▲12.76
Total valid votes		36,174	100.00	
Total rejected ballots		760		
Unreturned ballots		179		
Turnout		37,113	78.75	▼2.58
Registered electors		47,128		
Majority		614	1.70	▼20.64
BN hold		Swing		
Source(s) "His Majesty's Government Gazette - Notice of Contested Election, Parliament for the State of Perak [P.U. (B) 237/2018]" (PDF). Attorney General's Chambers of Malaysia. 3 May 2018. "Federal Government Gazette - Results of Contested Election and Statements of the Poll after the Official Addition of Votes, Parliamentary Constituencies for the State of Perak [P.U. (B) 311/2018]" (PDF). Attorney General's Chambers of Malaysia. 28 May 2018.

Malaysian general election, 2013
Party	Candidate	Votes	%	∆%
BN	Saravanan Murugan	20,670	57.73	▲1.73
PKR	Vasantha Kumar Krishnan	12,743	35.59	▼8.41
Pan-Malaysian Islamic Front	Shaharuzzaman Bistamam	2,053	5.73	▲5.73
Independent	Ridzuan Bani	337	0.94	▲0.94
Total valid votes		35,803	100.00	
Total rejected ballots		1,040		
Unreturned ballots		101		
Turnout		36,994	81.33	▲11.21
Registered electors		45,485		
Majority		7,927	22.34	▲10.34
BN hold		Swing		
Source(s) "Federal Government Gazette - Notice of Contested Election, Parliament for the State of Perak [P.U. (B) 174/2013]" (PDF). Attorney General's Chambers of Malaysia. 26 April 2013. Archived from the original (PDF) on 2019-12-29. "Federal Government Gazette - Results of Contested Election and Statements of the Poll after the Official Addition of Votes, Parliamentary Constituencies for the State of Perak [P.U. (B) 215/2013]" (PDF). Attorney General's Chambers of Malaysia. 22 May 2013.

Malaysian general election, 2008
Party	Candidate	Votes	%	∆%
BN	Saravanan Murugan	14,084	56.00	▼13.72
PKR	Tan Seng Toh	11,064	44.00	▲44.00
Total valid votes		25,148	100.00	
Total rejected ballots		1,662		
Unreturned ballots		1		
Turnout		26,811	70.12	▲4.10
Registered electors		38,236		
Majority		3,020	12.00	▼27.44
BN hold		Swing		

Malaysian general election, 2004
Party	Candidate	Votes	%	∆%
BN	Veerasingam Suppiah	16,945	69.72	▲8.09
PAS	Ahmad Razi Otman	7,359	30.28	▲30.28
Total valid votes		24,304	100.00	
Total rejected ballots		956		
Unreturned ballots		421		
Turnout		25,681	66.02	▲0.74
Registered electors		38,898		
Majority		9,586	39.44	▲16.18
BN hold		Swing		

Malaysian general election, 1999
Party	Candidate	Votes	%	∆%
BN	Veerasingam Suppiah	14,945	61.63	▼2.84
PKR	Kamarudin Awang Teh	9,306	38.37	▲38.37
Total valid votes		24,251	100.00	
Total rejected ballots		868		
Unreturned ballots		1,101		
Turnout		26,220	65.28	▲0.62
Registered electors		40,165		
Majority		5,639	23.26	▼17.60
BN hold		Swing		

Malaysian general election, 1995
Party	Candidate	Votes	%	∆%
BN	Kumaran Karunagaran	15,543	64.47	▲3.95
DAP	Mohamad Asri Othman	5,692	23.61	▲23.61
PAS	Mohamed Hamka Mohamed Jumah	2,596	10.77	▲10.77
Independent	Foo Khon Yow	278	1.15	▲1.15
Total valid votes		24,109	100.00	
Total rejected ballots		1,298		
Unreturned ballots		349		
Turnout		25,756	64.66	▼3.04
Registered electors		39,832		
Majority		9,851	40.86	▲19.82
BN hold		Swing		

Malaysian general election, 1990
Party	Candidate	Votes	%	∆%
BN	Kumaran Karunagaran	15,015	60.52	▲1.12
S46	Abdul Wahab Abu Bakar	9,794	39.48	▲39.48
Total valid votes		24,809	100.00	
Total rejected ballots		1,057		
Unreturned ballots		0		
Turnout		25,866	67.70	▼0.31
Registered electors		38,209		
Majority		5,221	21.04	▼5.14
BN hold		Swing		

Malaysian general election, 1986
Party	Candidate	Votes	%
BN	M. G. Pandithan	13,582	59.40
DAP	Loh Jee Mee @ Jimmy	7,597	33.22
PAS	M Busra Anuwar	1,688	7.38
Total valid votes		22,867	100.00
Total rejected ballots		761	
Unreturned ballots		0	
Turnout		23,628	68.01
Registered electors		34,743	
Majority		5,985	26.18
This was a new constituency created.
