= Kampung Buah Pala =

- Village
- Nickname: High Chaparral
- Location within Malaysia
- Coordinates: 5°22′35″N 100°18′20″E

Population
  - Estimate (2009): 24 households
- Time zone: UTC+8

Kampung Buah Pala (nicknamed High Chaparral) was a small village in Penang, Malaysia inhabited mostly by Indians at Gelugor. The 200-year-old village was controversially demolished in 2009 under the government of Lim Guan Eng.

== History ==
The land on which the village stood was formally part of the Brown estate, which was closed in 1956 when the land was transferred to the state government. The primarily-Indian-origin inhabitants of the land, who were labourers on the Brown estate, were granted a Temporary Occupation Licence (TOL) paying an annual rent on the land. The inhabitants herded cattle on the land, which progressively became more and more hemmed in by urban development around it.

== Demolition ==
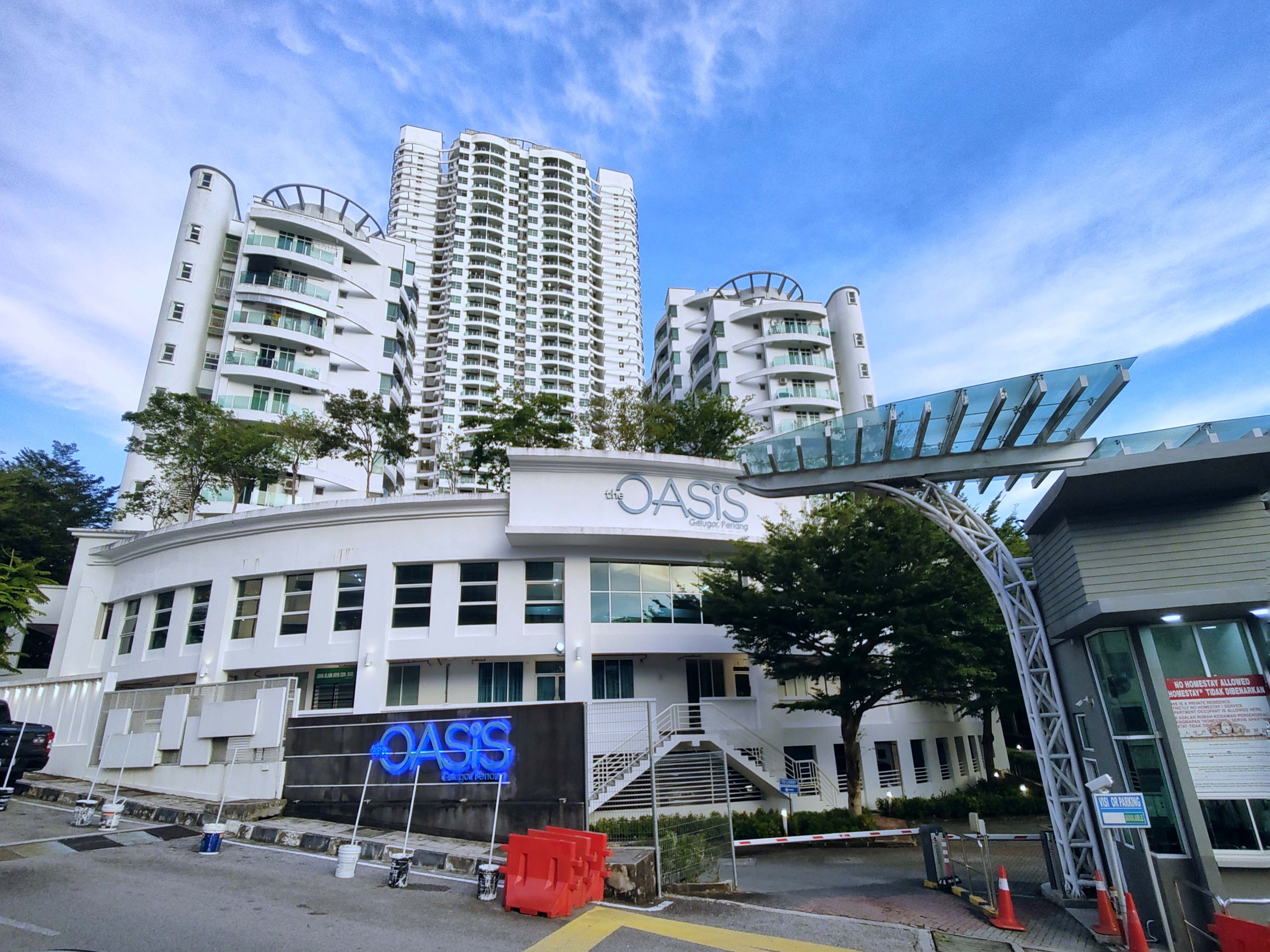
The Oasis Condominium occupies the former site of Kampung Buah Pala

In 2004, the land on which the village stood on was sold by the state government to a developer for redevelopment. The eventual demolition by developer Nusmetro Ventures followed a campaign by residents to save the village that was pursued in the Malaysian courts all the way to the Federal Court, a campaign of physical resistance over a number of days prior to the eventual demolition on 14 September 2009. This followed a promise by the Pakatan Rakyat state government to prevent the demolition during the 2008 state elections. Lim Guan Eng later claimed not to have been aware of the promise.

Criticism of the demolition by Jimmy Lim subsequently led to him and others being unsuccessfully sued by Lim Guan Eng for defamation.
