= L. Krishnan =

Indian-born film director and screenwriter (1922–2026)

Tan Sri L. Krishnan
- Born: Lakshmana Krishnan; 21 October 1922; Madras, India
- Died: 24 September 2026 (aged 103); Chiang Mai, Thailand
- Occupation: Film director
- Years active: 1942–1970
- Spouse: Puan Sri Rukmanee

Lakshmanan Krishnan (21 October 1922 – 24 September 2026) was a Malaysian film director and screenwriter.

== Life and career ==
Krishnan was born on 21 October 1922 in Madras, British India, and raised in Penang, Malaysia. In 1947, he became an assistant film director at Kalaivani Films in Madras. Krishnan moved to Singapore in 1949, and became a film director at Shaw Studio. After 11 years in Singapore, Krishnan moved to Kuala Lumpur, where he continued his career. In 1963, he resigned from Studio Merdeka to venture into business on his own.

Throughout his career directing over 30 films, he successfully launched the careers of several major figures in the local film industry who went on to become renowned legends. Among them are P. Ramlee, Maria Menado, Kasma Booty, Mustapha Maarof, M. Amin, Latifah Omar, and Rosnani Jamil.

Krishnan died in Chiang Mai, Thailand on 24 September 2026, at the age of 103. He died at 2.15pm local time due to old age.

== Filmography ==
=== At Malay Film Productions ===
- Bakti (1950) – debut film
- Pembalasan (1950)
- Takdir Ilahi (1950)
- Rayuan Sukma (1951)
- Penghidupan (1951)
- Derita (1951)
- Tas Tangan Wanita (1952)
- Antara Senyum dan Tangis (1952)
- Untuk Sesuap Nasi (1953)
- Nafsu (1954)
- Tangkisan Ibu (1954)
- Pertarohan (1954)
- Duka Nestapa (1955)
- Selamat Hari Raya (1955)
- Selamat Tinggal Kekasihku (1955)
- Kasih Menumpang (1955)
- Azan (1956)
- Dongang Sayang (1956)
- Mega Mendung (1956)

=== At Cathay-Keris Film Productions ===
- Orang Minyak (1958)
- Serangan Orang Minyak (1958)
- Orang Licin (1958)
- Rasa Sayang Eh (1958)
- Chinta Gadis Rimba (1958)
- Raden Mas (1959)
- Che Mamat Parang Tumpul (1960)
- Hantu Rimau (1960)

=== At Merdeka Film Productions ===
- Tun Tijah (1960)
- Keris Sempena Riau (1961)
- Ratapan Ibu (1962)
- Selendang Merah (1962) – final film directed by
