= 2026 ASEAN University Games =

Sports event in Kuala Lumpur, Malaysia

XXII ASEAN University Games
- Host city: Kuala Lumpur, Malaysia
- Motto: Hollistic, Excellence
- Nations: 11
- Events: 193 in 18 sports
- Opening: 12 December
- Closing: 19 December
- Ceremony venue: UiTM Stadium (opening); His Highness Chancellor Hall, University of Malaya (closing)
- Website: www.aug2026.my

2026 ASEAN University Games, officially known as the XXII ASEAN University Games and also known as Kuala Lumpur 2026, is a regional multi-sport event that will take place in Kuala Lumpur, Malaysia from 12–19 December 2026. This would be Malaysia's fourth time to host the Games, with its last turn being in 2008.

Malaysia was selected as host over Cambodia during the 2024 ASEAN University Games Technical Meeting in Surabaya and Malang, Indonesia on 25 June 2024. The nation was supposed to host the 2024 edition, but had to hand it over to Indonesia upon the latter's request.

The event will be held across five major towns in the Klang Valley namely Kuala Lumpur, Serdang, Bangi, Shah Alam and Klang, with a total of 193 sports to be contested across 18 sports.

== Venues ==
Five public universities across the 5 Klang valley cities were named as the main hub of the 2026 ASEAN University Games, while several existing public sport facilities in Klang and Shah Alam were also rented out as additional venues.

City	Competition Venue	Sports
Kuala Lumpur
Kuala Lumpur	University of Malaya Multi-purpose Hall	Badminton
Kuala Lumpur	University of Malaya His Highness Chancelllor Hall	Table Tennis, Closing ceremony
Kuala Lumpur	ACE University of Malaya Centre of Excellence Squash Courts	Squash
Kuala Lumpur	University of Malaya Arena	Football
Kuala Lumpur	Shooting Range, National Defence University of Malaysia	Shooting
Kuala Lumpur	National Sepak Takraw Academy	Sepak Takraw
Bangi, Kajang
Bangi, Kajang	National University of Malaysia Stadium	Archery
Bangi, Kajang	Tun Abdul Razak Chancellor Hall, National University of Malaysia	Taekwondo
Bangi, Kajang	Gemilang Hall, National University of Malaysia	Volleyball (Indoor)
Serdang, Subang Jaya
Serdang, Subang Jaya	UPM Stadium	Athletics
Serdang, Subang Jaya	Rugby field, University of Putra Malaysia	Rugby sevens
Serdang, Subang Jaya	University of Putra Malaysia Grand Hall	Pencak silat
Shah Alam
Shah Alam	Sri Budiman Pavillion, Universiti Teknologi MARA	Chess
Shah Alam	UiTM Stadium	Football, Opening ceremony
Shah Alam	His Highness Chancellor Hall, Universiti Teknologi MARA	Karate
Shah Alam	Sportizza Sports Arena	Futsal
Shah Alam	Universiti Teknologi MARA Multi-Purpose Hall	Netball
Shah Alam	Universiti Teknologi MARA Petanque Arena Court 3	Petanque
Shah Alam	Selangor Aquatic Centre	Swimming
Klang	Bukit Tinggi Basketball Association Hall	Basketball

== Torch relay ==
From the Ministry of Higher Education Headquarters in Putrajaya, the torch relays to all five major Universities in the Klang Valley all the way to Universiti Teknologi MARA during the opening ceremony on 12 December 2026. The University of Malaya stop, originally scheduled for 27 October 2026 was postponed due to Transboundary haze.

Stop	Date	Ref
Ministry of Higher Education Headquarters, Putrajaya	20 August 2026	
University of Putra Malaysia, Serdang, Selangor	9 October 2026	
University of Malaya, Kuala Lumpur	11 November 2026	
National University of Malaysia, Bangi, Selangor	18 November 2026	
National Defence University of Malaysia, Kuala Lumpur	24 November 2026	
Universiti Teknologi MARA, Shah Alam, Selangor	12 December 2026	

== Marketing ==
Tigraze the tiger, mascot of the 2026 ASEAN University Games.

The games' logo and mascot were unveiled at Vivatel Hotel in Kuala Lumpur on 4 December 2025.

=== Logo ===
The logo features a colourful geometric pattern of the Malaysian songket, known as ‘Bunga Pecah Lapan’ (or Eight-petal Flower) to symbolise cultural heritage, fine craftsmanship, and shared values. Its symmetrical vertical composition represents the foundation for academic and athletic excellence toward common goals, while the inclusion of human icons and the red-colored letters ‘AUG’ represents inclusivity and diversity, and the unity of the ASEAN people under one regional identity. Five colours featured on the logo are blue, red, yellow, green and black.

=== Mascot ===
A Malayan Tiger named Tigraze was chosen as official mascot for the 2026 ASEAN University Games to symbolise courage, agility, energy, resilience, bravery, collaboration, and a strong fighting spirit of an athlete as well as spirit of sportsmanship and the aspirations of the Games. Its cheerful expression and dynamic pose reflects confidence, readiness to face challenges, and a sense of camaraderie among athletes and the university community. The mascot wears an attire and sport shoes that features the colours of the logo.

== Sports ==
193 events were disputed across 18 sports (19 disciplines) of the Games.

- Archery (9)
- Athletics (44)
- Badminton (7)
- Basketball (2)
- Chess (8)
- Football (1)
- Futsal (1)
- Karate (16)
- Netball (1)
- Pencak silat (19)
- Petanque (4)
- Rugby sevens (2)
- Sepak takraw (3)
- Shooting (10)
- Squash (3)
- Swimming (38)
- Table tennis (4)
- Taekwondo (19)
- Volleyball (2)

== See also ==
For last edition of ASEAN University Games hosted by Malaysia, see

- 2008 ASEAN University Games

For other events that happened in Malaysia in 2026, see

- 2026 in Malaysia

For other sporting events that took place in Malaysia in 2026, see

- 2026 Sukma Games
- 2026 Para Sukma Games

For next ASEAN regional-level sporting event hosted by Malaysia, see

- 2027 SEA Games
