= 2025 Gerik bus crash =

Bus accident in Perak, Malaysia

- Crash site (Perak)

Details
- Date: 9 June 2025 c. 01:10 (MST)
- Location: Kilometre 53, East–West Highway, Banun, near Banding Lake, Gerik, Perak, Malaysia
- Coordinates: 5.5809217°N 101.4570077°E
- Incident type: Collision
- Cause: Suspected human error or road condition (preliminary report; under investigation)

Statistics
- Vehicles: 2 (1 bus and 1 MPV)
- Passengers: 46 (42 on bus, 4 in the MPV)
- Crew: 2 (bus)
- Deaths: 15
- Injured: 33
- Damage: Severe damage to both vehicles

On 9 June 2025, 15 students from Sultan Idris Education University (UPSI) were killed and 33 others injured when a privately chartered bus collided with an MPV along the East–West Highway near Banun, Gerik, Perak, Malaysia. The bus was returning to the university's campus in Tanjong Malim after the Eid al-Adha holiday break. The incident was the deadliest road accident in Malaysia since the 2013 Genting Highlands bus crash.

Preliminary findings from investigations suggested human error or road conditions as likely factors for the crash. The bus driver, a 39-year old man, was charged in court with 15 counts of dangerous driving and one count of reckless driving, although he pleaded not guilty. The crash generated significant public discourse in Malaysia, with public figures and citizens across the nation expressing their condolences.

== Background ==
=== East–West Highway ===
The East-West Highway, Federal Route FT004, spans approximately 114.66 km, linking the towns of Baling, Gerik, and Jeli. Built according to R4 standards, the road is a two-lane single carriageway, with a design speed of 70 km/h and a posted speed limit of 60 km/h at certain locations.

The highway traverses hilly terrain and dense forest, particularly along the stretch near Gerik, Perak. The route features sharp bends, steep gradients, and is frequently affected by thick fog and heavy rainfall, all of which significantly reduce visibility and vehicle control. Emergency lanes, climbing lanes, and adequate street lighting are largely absent, especially near sharp corners.

Structural deficiencies are also evident, as the road, which was nearly 60 years old, suffers from potholes and poor maintenance. More than 70% of the route has been reported to be in critical condition, with previous repairs often limited to temporary patchwork.

In response to these safety and infrastructure concerns, the Malaysian government initiated major rehabilitation works. In 2023, a total of RM60 million was allocated for resurfacing, bridge repairs, and lighting and traffic signal upgrades, primarily during July and August. An additional RM7.2 million was approved in 2024 for further improvements to other damaged sections of the highway, guided by a pavement condition assessment conducted by the Ministry of Works.

=== The bus and journey ===
The bus involved in the crash was a Hino RK1JSLL/J08C-TK tour bus bearing the registration plate PLD 8892, operated by Kenari Utara Travel & Tours Sdn Bhd, a private limited company incorporated in Malaysia in 2008. The company holds a valid license to conduct travel and tour services. The bus was purchased in 2013 and remained legally eligible for use as a tour vehicle for another five years. It had reportedly undergone routine servicing as recently as May 2025. However, as it was manufactured before the implementation of post-2020 safety regulations, the bus was not equipped with passenger seat belts.

The journey was privately arranged by a group of students from Sultan Idris Education University (UPSI) to return to their main campus in Tanjong Malim, Perak, following the end of the Eid al-Adha holiday break. The students had independently chartered the bus for a long-distance interstate trip, which began in Jerteh, Terengganu, on the night of 8 June 2025. A total of 44 individuals were on board the bus, comprising 42 students, the bus driver, and an attendant. The journey was expected to take approximately more than six hours, covering hundreds of kilometres along the East–West Highway.

== Crash ==
The location of the crash

On the night of 8 June 2025, the bus departed from Hadhari Mosque in Jerteh at around 9 pm MST. At approximately 01:10 am on 9 June 2025, the bus crashed along Kilometre 53 of the East–West Highway (Gerik–Jeli stretch). The crash occurred on a dark, downhill, and winding right-hand curve, where the bus was reportedly speeding and attempting to overtake another vehicle (a Honda Odyssey). Dashcam footage later confirmed this overtaking attempt. The driver, described by survivors as "agitated and shouting before the crash", had earlier avoided multiple vehicles as the bus descended rapidly. One survivor also reported that she smelled a "burning odor" before the crash occurred.

While overtaking, the bus lost control, veered left, and flipped onto its side, violently colliding with the rear of a Perodua Alza minivan (KDW7804) traveling in the same direction toward Baling, Kedah. The impact caused the minivan to spin clockwise and swerve into a ditch on the opposite side of the road, while the bus struck a W-beam guardrail, which failed to stop its momentum. The bus then spun counter-clockwise, with parts of the rail penetrating the roof and structural pillars, before overturning near a ravine.

The crash occurred under clear weather conditions with a dry road surface, but there was no street lighting, and most passengers were asleep at the time. Many were violently ejected from the bus, landing in nearby ditches. Witnesses described the scene as chaotic, with mangled wreckage and a potential fire risk. A passing motorist attempted to turn off the bus engine to prevent an explosion, though no fire broke out.

Emergency services were alerted by Gerik Hospital, and first responders from the Royal Malaysia Police (PDRM), Fire and Rescue Departments of Gerik and Jeli, Malaysia Civil Defence Force (APM), and medical personnel arrived shortly after. Firefighters had to cut open the rear of the bus to extricate trapped victims. Rescue efforts were hampered by the steep terrain, darkness, and the position of the overturned bus.

In total, 48 individuals were involved. Thirteen UPSI students died at the scene, while two more succumbed to injuries at the hospital, bringing the death toll to 15. The remaining 33 passengers sustained various injuries and were transported to Gerik Hospital for treatment.

== Aftermath ==
After the crash, 15 students were killed. Thirteen were confirmed dead at the scene, while two others died while receiving treatment at the hospital. Of the fatalities, 11 were seated on the left side of the bus, three on the right side, and one at the very back. Both bus drivers and other passengers sustained various degrees of injuries. The Perodua Alza involved in the crash also had injured occupants, but there were no fatalities in that vehicle. All injured victims were transported to hospitals for treatment. The four occupants of the MPV survived with less serious injuries and were treated in Baling. Most of the injured bus passengers received treatment at Gerik Hospital, while the majority of post-mortems were conducted at Raja Permaisuri Bainun Hospital in Ipoh. Two post-mortems were carried out at Gerik Hospital. By late evening on the day of the crash, all 15 bodies had been identified. Funerals for all the deceased were held in Jerteh, except for one victim who was laid to rest in Setiu.

=== Public reactions and tributes ===
The incident sparked widespread public reaction across Malaysia. Prime Minister Anwar Ibrahim expressed heartfelt sympathy to the families of the victims and instructed the Higher Education Ministry to coordinate appropriate assistance. Higher education minister Zambry Abdul Kadir announced that accommodation assistance for the victims' families was being coordinated with Ungku Omar Polytechnic in Ipoh and Gerik Community College. Zambry also contributed his one month's salary as a gesture of solidarity. UPSI responded by establishing a special operations room to publish updates related to the crash and to handle inquiries from the victims' families and the public.

On 16 June, the higher education ministry held a Majlis Tahlil Perdana ('Grand Memorial Prayer') to commemorate the victims of the crash. The ceremony was attended by over 5,000 individuals, including the higher education minister Zambry Abdul Kadir, Perak Menteri Besar Saarani Mohamad and chief secretary to the government Shamsul Azri Abu Bakar. During the event, more than RM2 million in contributions — collected from various agencies and corporate bodies — were presented to be channelled to the families of the deceased and those who were injured. A special fund, known as "Tabung KPT Prihatin", administered by UPSI, was established to assist the families and victims affected by the crash. As of 16 June, the fund collected RM1.7 million, contributed by over 40 public and private higher education institutions, including polytechnics, community colleges, state government agencies, financial institutions, and corporate entities. The fund was disbursed in stages to eligible recipients and was closed on 20 June.

Perak's ruler Nazrin Shah emphasised the need for "preventative measures to avoid future tragedies". Religious affairs minister Mohd Na'im Mokhtar described the students as fi sabilillah ('for the cause of Allah') emphasising their status as "seekers of knowledge in the path of Allah, which in Islam is a highly regarded pursuit." Law minister Azalina Othman Said said that "companies as a whole must be held accountable — not just bus drivers — when accidents occur due to managerial negligence or failure to comply with safety standards." She emphasised the need for legislation similar to the Corporate Manslaughter and Corporate Homicide Act 2007 in the United Kingdom to be introduced in Malaysia, in order to ensure broader corporate accountability, including that of managers, engineers, and board members. According to her, "companies should not place the blame solely on lower-level employees, particularly when those individuals operate under the direction and responsibility of the organisation. Such legislation could help prevent future tragedies and ensure justice is served for victims."

The crash sparked calls for reform to Malaysia's road safety laws through protests and on social media. Concerns were raised about road infrastructure, with some experts warning that certain road furniture might have worsened accidents.

Social media platforms such as X were flooded with messages of condolences, with the hashtags #UPSIberduka ('UPSI in mourning'), #TragediGerik ('Gerik tragedy'), #DoaUntukUPSI ('prayers for UPSI'), and #AlFatihah becoming widely used among Malaysian users. Prayer gatherings and tahlil ceremonies were organised at mosques and institutions of higher education across the country. The student representative council of Universiti Utara Malaysia (UUM) raised RM290,651 through contributions from 18,927 individuals which was distributed to the families of the victims and the students affected by the crash. UPSI Vice-Chancellor Md Amin Md Taff emphasised the importance of ensuring that students injured in the crash in Gerik are not left behind in their studies and receive full academic support, calling on deans and lecturers to assist the affected students, including those currently receiving treatment in hospital or recovering at home, by making use of the existing flexible learning system. Meanwhile, more than 200 individuals attended the blood donation centre at Raja Permaisuri Bainun Hospital, following reports of a shortage of blood types A and B. The hospital however, officially denied of a blood shortage.

== Investigation ==
Following the crash, a multi-agency investigation has been launched to determine the exact cause of the incident. On 11 June 2025, the Cabinet instructed the Ministry of Transport to coordinate and produce a full report on the incident. The investigation was handled by a special task force that had already been set up on 14 May 2025 for a different crash involving a Federal Reserve Unit (FRU) lorry in Teluk Intan. The task force's scope was subsequently expanded to cover the bus crash.

The Royal Malaysia Police (PDRM) announced the formation of a special task force to probe the crash in collaboration with the Malaysian Institute of Road Safety Research (MIROS), the Road Transport Department (JPJ), the Land Public Transport Agency (APAD), and other relevant authorities. Initial investigations revealed that the bus overturned after colliding with a Perodua Alza. Survivors reported smelling a "burning odour" and said that the bus was speeding. The following day, the injured bus driver said that the vehicle's brakes had failed and that he had attempted to avoid hitting four other vehicles before colliding with the MPV.

Transport minister Anthony Loke warned the bus driver not to make premature claims about the cause of the crash. He emphasised that "the cause of the accident had not yet been established" and that "it could be attributed either to road conditions or driver error". The crash site was reportedly "dark at night and located in a highland area often shrouded in mist". Loke confirmed that a detailed investigation was underway and said that the bus's braking system had already been examined by Puspakom. He cautioned against accepting the driver's statements at face value, saying that "mechanical tests would confirm the validity of his claims". Loke also mentioned that dashcam footage had surfaced showing the bus speeding while overtaking and that an audit of the bus company revealed a failure to meet safety standards.

The driver's prior offences became a factor in the investigation. It was found that the bus driver had 18 traffic summonses; 13 of which were for speeding. The remaining summonses included one for a previous accident, three for failing to wear a seatbelt, and one for a missing third brake light. Meanwhile, the bus itself had 21 traffic offences, with 16 already adjudicated and five still under investigation. According to police, the special task force would conduct a thorough investigation covering the driver's record, background, conduct, and employment history. They confirmed that the charges could be brought against the driver once the investigation is complete.

On 11 June, the police had recorded statements from 18 individuals to assist in the investigation. These included 13 surviving UPSI students who had been discharged from hospital, the driver of the MPV involved in the collision, a forensic doctor from Gerik Hospital, the MPV driver's wife (still receiving treatment), and a dashcam owner whose footage went viral. However, the police had yet to obtain a statement from the bus driver as he remained hospitalised. A remand application would be submitted once he was discharged. Blood samples from the driver had been sent to the chemistry department for analysis. Perak police chief Noor Hisam Nordin confirmed that the police were working closely with JPJ, the chemistry department, the public works department (JKR), and the Bukit Aman forensics division to conduct a detailed investigation. The dashcam footage was also being analysed by experts to confirm its authenticity, as the video's quality was unclear. On 12 June, the 39-year-old driver was detained after being discharged from Taiping Hospital and would be investigated under Section 41(1) of the Road Transport Act 1987 for reckless driving causing death. The driver, who only sustained injuries to his hand, is scheduled to be charged the following day at the Magistrates' Court in Gerik.

In a related development, claims circulated on social media suggesting that the operating company, Syarikat Kenari Utara, had hired a lorry driver as a substitute for the bus trip. However, the company denied these allegations. The company's operations officer, Mohd Nazri Nawi, claimed that the replacement driver had "extensive experience operating express buses and a clean record free from any criminal or drug-related offences". He said that the original driver was on leave due to family matters, and the company had conducted "thorough screening" before appointing a replacement driver from another bus company. That said, preliminary investigations revealed that the company had breached various permit conditions and regulations set by the authorities. Loke revealed that the permit holder had illegally sublet the vehicle permit to a third party without approval and had failed to ensure the vehicle's GPS system was functioning. These were identified as two serious violations of the Land Public Transport Agency's permit requirements. The permit owner, registered in Kedah, had leased the permit to an individual from Kelantan for a monthly fee of RM500.

As a result of these breaches, the company's operating license and all associated vehicle permits were immediately revoked. On 11 June, police recorded a statement from the company owner, and statements were also taken from 18 other witnesses, including students from UPSI. On 12 June, Loke further revealed that the company had failed to comply with all seven mandatory components of the safety inspection and audit. These failures included the absence of a safety supervisor, inadequate GPS monitoring of drivers, failure to adhere to driving time limits and rest periods, lack of an emergency response plan, and the absence of a hotline. He instructed the Road Transport Department to open an investigation paper into the company, with legal action pending — including the possibility of prosecuting the company owner for failing to adhere to safety and operational regulations. Loke emphasised that "even if the operator is not the driver, they still bear full responsibility in ensuring the safe operation of their bus company."

On 13 June, the bus driver, Mohd Amirul Fadhil Zulkifli was charged with 15 counts of dangerous driving and one of reckless driving. He pleaded not guilty and was released on RM19,000 bail with conditions including a driving ban. A Puspakom report found no mechanical faults that caused the crash. JPJ later suspended his vocational licence and opened investigations into the bus operators.

== See also ==
- List of traffic collisions (2000–present)
