= 2025 Ayer Kuning by-election =

By-election in Malaysia in 2025

- 26 April 2025

N48 Ayer Kuning seat in the Perak State Legislative Assembly
- Turnout: 58.06%（▼16.79%）
	First party	Second party	Third party
	BN	PN	PSM
Candidate	Mohamad Yusri Bakir	Abdul Muhaimin Malek	Bawani Kaniapan
Party	UMNO	PAS	PSM
Alliance	BN	PN
Popular vote	11,065	6,059	1,106
Percentage	60.70%	33.23%	6.07%
Ayer Kuning assemblyman before election
Ishsam Shahruddin (deceased)
Barisan Nasional (UMNO)
Elected Ayer Kuning assemblyman
Mohamad Yusri Bakir
Barisan Nasional (UMNO)

The 2025 Ayer Kuning by-election was a by-election for the Perak State Legislative Assembly seat of Ayer Kuning held on 26 April 2025. It was called following the death of incumbent, Ishsam Shahruddin on 22 February 2025. Ishsam served as Member of the Perak State Legislative Assembly (MLA) from 2022.

Barisan Nasional's Mohamad Yusri Bakir defeated both Perikatan Nasional's Abdul Muhaimin Malek and the Socialist Party of Malaysia's Bawani Kaniapan by a majority of 5,006 votes.

== Nomination ==
On 24 February, the National Trust Party (AMANAH), who previously contested the seat under Pakatan Harapan's (PH) banner in the last election, confirmed it would make way for the Barisan Nasional (BN) candidate in the by-election. BN Chairman Ahmad Zahid Hamidi said the candidate will be selected among six shortlisted names chosen by Tapah UMNO, and is expected to be announced a week before nomination day. On 7 April, BN named Islamic academic and Tapah UMNO Secretary Mohamad Yusri Bakir as its candidate.

On 28 February, Perikatan Nasional (PN) Chairman Muhyiddin Yassin confirmed that the coalition's candidate will be from the Malaysian Islamic Party (PAS). PAS' Tapah branch was also reported to have shortlisted three names as possible candidates, primarily young local candidates. On 8 April, PN announced Tapah PN chairman Abdul Muhaimin Malek as its candidate.

The Socialist Party of Malaysia (PSM), who also contested the seat in the last election, was reported to be in consideration on whether to contest in the by-election. PSM Chairman Michael Jeyakumar Devaraj said the matter would be discussed among the party, and with electoral allies the Malaysian United Democratic Alliance (MUDA) and Parti Rakyat Malaysia (PRM). On 22 March, PSM confirmed it will contest in the by-election, with MUDA pledging to support their bid the following day. On 8 April, PSM once again fielded Bawani Kaniapan as their candidate for the seat.

== Timeline ==
The key dates are listed below.

Date	Event
7 March 2025	Issue of the Writ of Election
12 April 2025	Nomination day
12 - 25 April 2025	Campaigning period
22 - 25 April 2025	Early polling days for postal and overseas voters
26 April 2025	Polling day

== Results ==
Perak state by-election, 26 April 2025: Ayer Kuning Upon the death of incumbent, Ishsam Shahruddin
Party	Candidate	Votes	%	∆%
BN	Mohamad Yusri Bakir	11,065	60.70	▲21.97
PN	Abdul Muhaimin Malek	6,059	33.23	▲3.93
Parti Sosialis Malaysia	Bawani Kaniapan	1,106	6.07	▲3.57
Total valid votes		18,230	100.00	
Total rejected ballots		289		
Unreturned ballots		3		
Turnout		18,522	58.06	▼16.79
Registered electors		31,897		
Majority		5,006	27.47	▲18.04
BN hold		Swing		

== Previous results ==
Perak state election, 2022: Ayer Kuning
Party	Candidate	Votes	%	∆%
BN	Ishsam Shahruddin	9,088	38.73	▼8.90
PH	Mohd Nazri Hashim	6,875	29.30	▼7.46
PN	Muhamamd Noor Farid Zainal	6,812	29.03	▲29.03
Parti Sosialis Malaysia	Bawani Kaniapan	586	2.50	▲2.50
GTA	Maziah Salim	105	0.45	▲0.45
Total valid votes		23,466	100.00	
Total rejected ballots		394		
Unreturned ballots		46		
Turnout		23,906	74.85	▼5.39
Registered electors		31,940		
Majority		2,213	9.43	▼1.44
BN hold		Swing		
