= The Italian Baker =

Malaysian bakery chain based in Selangor

The Italian Baker Sdn Bhd
- Trade name: Massimo
- Type: Private Limited Company
- Industry: Bakery
- Founded: 2011; 15 years ago in Sungai Buloh, Malaysia
- Headquarters: Sungai Buloh, Selangor, Malaysia
- Products: Bread
- Parent: FFM Berhad
- Website: theitalianbaker.com.my

The Italian Baker Sdn Bhd (doing business as Massimo) is a Malaysian bakery chain based in Selangor owned by The Italian Baker Sdn Bhd, a subsidiary of Federal Flour Mills Berhad. Its bread is packed in 3 colours (green, white and red) based on the Italian flag, and baked with the combination of traditional techniques and modern machinery.

== Distribution ==
The Massimo company has invested MYR120 million into a fully automated bakery plant in Pulau Indah, Selangor which produces 16,000 loaves of bread and 24,000 buns daily and transport to West Malaysia.

== See also ==
- List of bakeries
