= Salinger House =

House in Kajang, Selangor, Malaysia

- Original location of the Salinger House prior to its relocation at some time before 2019
- 2°55′55″N 101°44′53″E (original)
- Location: Kajang, Selangor (original); Paroi, Seremban, Negeri Sembilan (new)
- Nearest city: Kuala Lumpur

History
- Built: 1986–1992

Site notes
- Architect: Jimmy Lim
- Architectural style: organic architecture

The Salinger House (also known as the Rudinara and the Salinger Residence) was a house built in Malaysia in 1992. Its design won the Aga Khan architectural prize in the 1996–98 cycle.

== Commissioning and design ==
The Salinger house was commissioned by Rudin Salinger, brother of the US president John F. Kennedy's press secretary Pierre Salinger and long-term resident of Malaysia, in August 1984. Together with his Malaysian wife Munira (AKA Monica), Rudin Salinger, a student of Malay culture and convert to Islam, requested a house that reflected their interests and religious faith, and which was to be built in traditional Malaysian style. Jimmy Lim, the architect commissioned for the project, designed a triangular-shaped house to be built of locally sourced wood.

Lim's objective when designing the house was to create a building in traditional Malay style, but with modern convenience also. For this reason, rather than having the linear design typical of a traditional Malay house, the Salinger House was constructed with a conjoined triangular design. The largest of these triangles to house the living area and kitchen raised on stilts above ground level, and a bathroom and bedroom in a first-floor above these, all enclosed by wooden wall for privacy. The smaller of the two triangles formed a veranda that was to serve as a dining area. To reflect the Muslim faith of the Salingers, the building was oriented towards Mecca. By October 1985, the design was complete.

The siting of the house, and its open construction, allowed it to remain cool without the need for air conditioning to be used.

== Construction ==
Lim enlisted a local carpenter by the name of Ibrahim bin Adam to construct the building, and sourced three hard-wood chengal trees from the Malaysian state park service. Chengal wood was selected for its resistance to water and termites. Adam, a master carpenter, and one of the last Malaysian carpenters skilled at building wood-framed buildings without the use of screws or other metal fasteners, was blind in one eye, and had lost a hand whilst fishing, but despite this was still capable of the precise measurements and delicate cuts necessary for construction of the house. Lim and Adam travelled to the state park and selected the trees that were to be used personally prior to their felling. The six year construction time of the house was mostly taken up by the time needed to source and cut the hard wood that the house was to be built out of.

At the raising of the first column (Tiang Seri in Malay), a ceremony was held in which a religious scholar read Surat Yassine and said the Doa’a Salamat (a prayer for safety and well-being). Carvings at the doorways within the house were provided by Haji Wan Su Othman and his son Wan Mustafa.

== Aga Khan prize and subsequent relocation ==
The Salinger House was nominated for the Aga Khan prize anonymously, and was one of seven houses from the Islamic world to win it in 1998. Ibrahim bin Adam travelled to Spain to personally receive the prize from Juan Carlos I.

The house was put up for sale by the Salingers in March 2006. The Salingers, then retired, put the house on sale as they were no longer able to maintain it. Following the sale of the land on which the house was located for development, the house was subsequently dismantled and moved from its original location, on Lot 3679, Jalan Haj Yusop, Kajang, to Paroi, Seremban, Negeri Sembilan, where it was rebuilt. Relocation was carried out at some point before 2019, with reconstruction being mostly finished by January 2019. A book written about the relocation of the house was published in 2022. The house is presently located at Lorong Titiwangsa 7, in the Taman Bukti community of Seremban.
