= East–West Highway =

The following roads are called the East-West Highway or a variant:

- East–West Highway (Malaysia)
- East-West Highway (Nepal)
- East–West Motorway (Romania)
- East–West Highway (Algeria)
- East–West Highway (Ho Chi Minh City)
- United States:
  - East-West Expressway (Miami), Florida, now known as the Dolphin Expressway (SR 836)
  - East-West Expressway (Orlando), Florida (SR 408)
  - East-West Highway (Harford County, Maryland), northeast of Baltimore
  - East-West Highway (Maryland suburbs), near Washington, D.C.
  - East-West Highway (New England), a proposal across northern New England
