= Mahathero =

Mahathero is a surname. Notable people with the surname include:

- Gyanashree Mahathero (1925–2025), Bangladeshi Buddhist monk
- Jyotipal Mahathero (1914–2002), Bangladeshi Buddhist monk
- Satya Priya Mahathero (1930–2019), Bangladeshi Buddhist monk
- Suddhananda Mahathero (1933–2020), Bangladeshi Buddhist monk
