= Carsome =

Malaysian online used car trading platform

Carsome Group
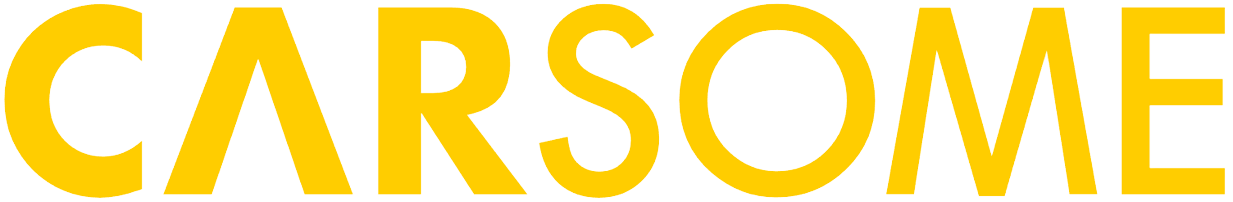
- Company type: Private
- Industry: E-Commerce
- Founded: 2015
- Founder: Eric Cheng
- Headquarters: Petaling Jaya, Selangor, Malaysia
- Area served: Malaysia; Indonesia; Thailand; Singapore; Philippines
- Website: www.carsome.my

Carsome Group (Carsome) is a Malaysian online used car trading platform that operates in Malaysia, Indonesia, Thailand, and Singapore. It was founded in 2015 with the aim of digitize the traditional used car buying and selling process by leveraging technology and providing a convenient and transparent experience for both buyers and sellers. It is recognized as Malaysia's first technology unicorn after announcing the closure of its US$170 million (RM705.5 million) of funding in September 2021.

== History ==
Carsome was established in Malaysia in 2015 by Eric Cheng and Jiun Ee Teoh, when they recognized the inefficiencies and lack of transparency in the used car industry, which often resulted in a frustrating experience for customers. They aimed to address these issues by creating an online platform that would streamline the process and provide a trusted marketplace for used cars. Initially, Carsome focused on the local market but quickly gained popularity among car buyers and sellers. The company's success in Malaysia led to its expansion into other Southeast Asian countries, including Indonesia, Thailand, and Singapore. By 2021, Carsome had become one of the leading players in the online used car industry in the region.
