= Jimmy Lim =

Malaysian architect (1944–2026)

Professor Jimmy Lim Cheok Siang
- Born: 30 June 1944; Penang, Straits Settlements
- Died: 28 September 2026 (aged 82)
- Education: University of New South Wales
- Occupation: Architect
- Spouse: Winnie Cheah
- Children: Lim Wei Ling Lim Cho-Wei
- Awards: Aga Khan Prize
- Practice: Project Architects; CSL Associates (now Jimmy Lim Design)

Jimmy Lim Cheok Siang (Chinese: 林倬生; pinyin: Lín Zhuōshēng; 30 June 1944 – 28 September 2026) was a Malaysian architect.

== Early life and career ==
Lim was born in Penang, Malaysia on 30 June 1944. He stated that he was interested in architecture from an early age due to the renovation activities of his grandfather, and due to a visit to the Kek Lok Si temple. In 1959 he left Penang for studies in Sydney, Australia, where he attended boarding school. In 1964 he began studying at the school of architecture of the University of New South Wales. Lim remained in Australia for 13 years before returning to Malaysia in 1972 to work as an architect for the Project Architects firm. His first project in Malaysia was a semi-conductor plant in Subang for Motorola.

In 1978 Lim began his own architecture firm, CSL associates, which is now called Jimmy Lim Design. His 1984 design for the CY Chiew house won the PAM House Award in 1984, and his design for the Salinger House (AKA Rudinara) won a Aga Khan Award for Architecture during the 1996–1998 cycle of that prize. Other prominent designs of his include the Schnyder house (AKA Precima House) which was designed for Swiss businessman Rolf W. Schnyder, the Menara Prudential office tower in Kuala Lumpur, and Resorts World Awana in Genting Highlands. In 2000 Lim also won the PAM Award in the Hotel and Resort category for his design of the Impiana Resort in Koh Samui, Thailand. In 2012 he received the SIA-Getz Architecture Prize for Emergent Architecture in Asia for sustainability. Lim was president of the Malaysian Institute of Architects, (Pertubuhan Akitek Malaysia, or PAM), and in 2021 received their gold medal for lifetime services to the architecture profession. During his career Lim taught as an adjunct professor at Curtin University and the University of Tasmania.

As of October 2024 Lim remained active as an architect. Lim was an advocate of natural design and the use of wood in construction. Lim also advocated prioritising interior over exterior design.

== Lim Guan Eng defamation lawsuit ==
In December 2013 an article quoting Jimmy Lim entitled "Guan Eng has failed, says NGO", about what he characterised as the destruction of Malaysian heritage in developments schemes carried out under the government of Penang Chief Minister Lim Guan Eng, was published on the Malaysian online news portal Free Malaysia Today. The article was particularly critical of the 2009 demolition of the 200-year old Kampung Buah Pala, and stated that Lim Guan Eng was indifferent to the fate of Indian communities. Lim Guan Eng then sued Jimmy Lim as well as other parties alleging defamation, and in August 2013 received a decision at the George Town High Court in his favour ordering the defendants to pay RM300,000 in damages and RM30,000 in legal costs. This decision, however, was overturned in 2016 on appeal to the Malaysian Court of Appeal, on the grounds that the article taken as a whole was not defamatory. Judge Hamid Sultan Abu Backer, the chair of the court, described the article as "written in a temperate tone".

== Personal life and death ==
Lim married Malaysian educator and professional Violinist Winnie Cheah in 1970. Cheah founded the Symphonia Fantasia String Ensemble. His daughter founded Wei-Ling Gallery and Wei-Ling Contemporary in 2002 and 2011, respectively, and ran the Malaysian heritage NGO, Badan Warisan, which Lim co-founded in 1983.

Lim died on 28 September 2026, at the age of 82.
