= Samsudin Abu Hassan =

Malaysian politician

Yang Berbahagia Dato' Samsudin Abu Hassan DPCM DPMP AMP PPT
- سمس الدين بن أبو حسن

Exco roles (Perak)
- 2013–2014: Chairman of the Consumer Affairs, Human Resources, Non-governmental Organisations and Civil Community
- 2014–2018: Chairman of the Entrepreneur Development, Co-operatives, Consumer Affairs, Non-governmental Organisations and Civil Community

Faction represented in Perak State Legislative Assembly
- 2004–2022: Barisan Nasional

Personal details
- Born: Perak, Malaysia
- Citizenship: Malaysian
- Party: United Malays National Organisation (UMNO)
- Other political affiliations: Barisan Nasional (BN); Perikatan Nasional (PN); Muafakat Nasional (MN)
- Occupation: Politician

Samsudin bin Abu Hassan is a Malaysian politician and served as Perak State Executive Councillor.

== Election results ==
Perak State Legislative Assembly
Year	Constituency	Candidate	Votes	Pct	Opponent(s)	Votes	Pct	Ballots cast	Majority	Turnout
2004	N47 Ayer Kuning	Samsudin Abu Hassan (UMNO)	10,218	75.36%	Mohamad Asri Othman (PKR)	3,341	24.64%	14,272	6,877	69.34%
2008	N47 Ayer Kuning	Samsudin Abu Hassan (UMNO)	8,628	61.61%	Ahmad Razi Othman (PAS)	5,376	38.39%	14,481	3,252	71.57%
2013	N47 Ayer Kuning	Samsudin Abu Hassan (UMNO)	11,094	58.39%	Ahmad Razi Othman (PAS)	7,609	40.05%	19,353	3,485	81.80%
2013	N47 Ayer Kuning	Samsudin Abu Hassan (UMNO)	11,094	58.39%	Kathiravan Murugan (IND)	297	1.56%	19,353	3,485	81.80%
2018	N48 Ayer Kuning	Samsudin Abu Hassan (UMNO)	9,141	47.64%	Tan Seng Toh (AMANAH)	7,054	36.76%	19,668	2,087	80.20%
2018	N48 Ayer Kuning	Samsudin Abu Hassan (UMNO)	9,141	47.64%	Salmah Ab Latiff (PAS)	2,993	15.60%	19,668	2,087	80.20%

== Honours ==
- Perak
  - Knight Commander of the Order of Cura Si Manja Kini (DPCM) – Dato' (2017)
  - Knight Commander of the Order of the Perak State Crown (DPMP) – Dato' (2005)
  - Member of the Order of the Perak State Crown (AMP) (2003)
  - Recipient of the Distinguished Conduct Medal (PPT) (2000)
