= Kasma Booty =

Malaysian actress (1932–2007)

Kasma Booty AMN
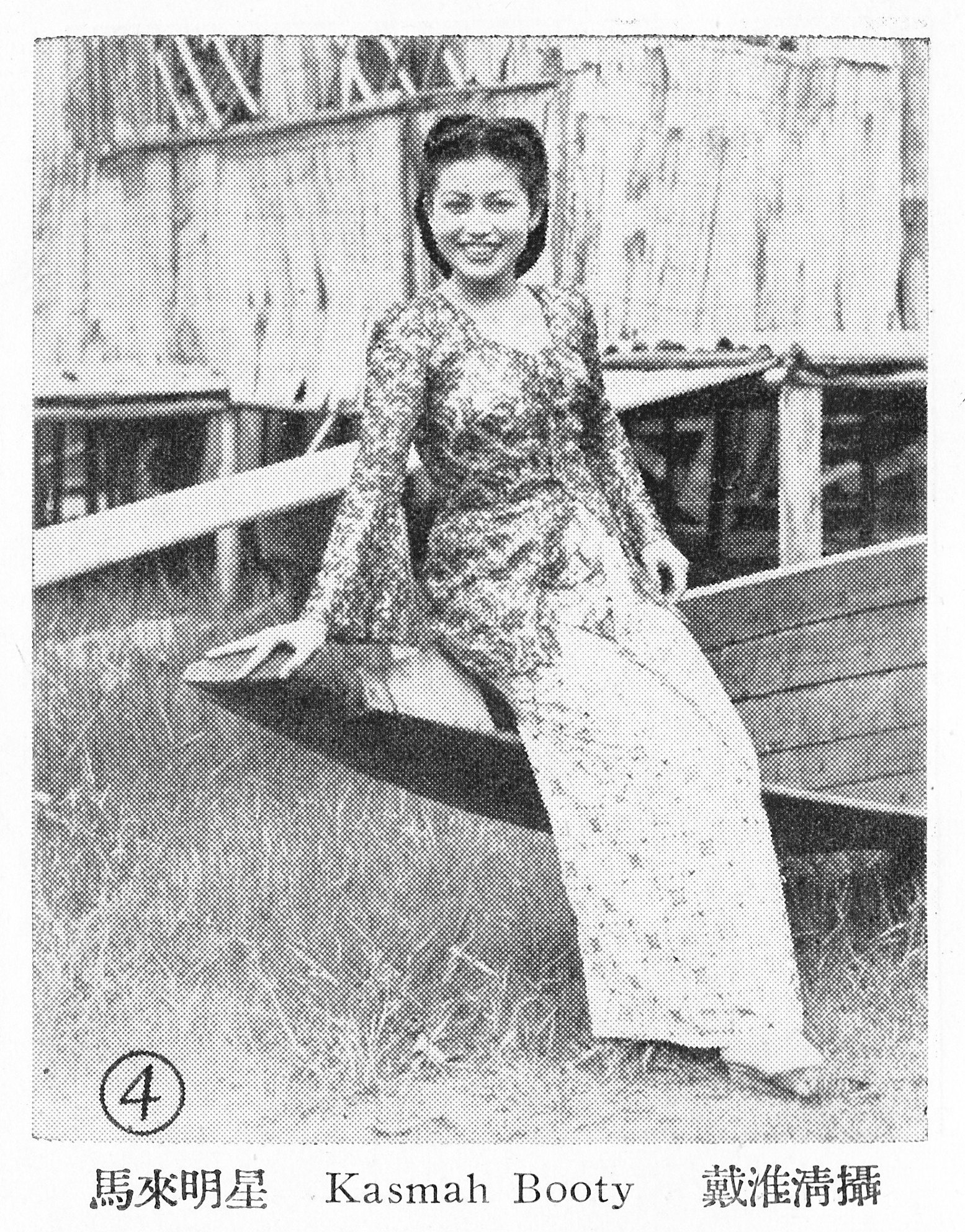
- Booty in 1952
- Born: Kasmah binti Abdullah; 1932; Kisaran, Sumatra's East Coast Residency, Dutch East Indies
- Died: 1 June 2007 (aged 74–75); Ampang, Kuala Lumpur, Malaysia
- Resting place: Klang Gates Muslim Cemetery, Taman Melawati, Selangor, Malaysia
- Occupations: Actress; model; artist
- Years active: 1948–1992
- Spouse: Jacob Booty
- Children: 5

Kasma Booty AMN (Jawi: كسم بوتي; born Kasmah binti Abdullah; c. 1932 – 1 June 2007) was an Indonesian-born Malaysian actress, dubbed the "Elizabeth Taylor of Malaysia".

== Personal life ==
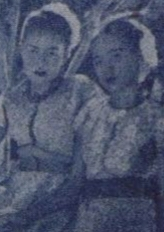
Kasma (left) with Siti Zainab (right)

Kasma Booty was born as Kasmah Abdullah in Kisaran, North Sumatra, Dutch East Indies (now Indonesia) of Dutch and Javanese descent. Beginning her acting and film career at the early age of 15, she ultimately changed her name to Kasma Booty after marrying her husband, Jacob Booty. The couple had four children - Cempaka, Asmara, Purnama (her youngest child) and Suria (who is now deceased).

== Acting career ==
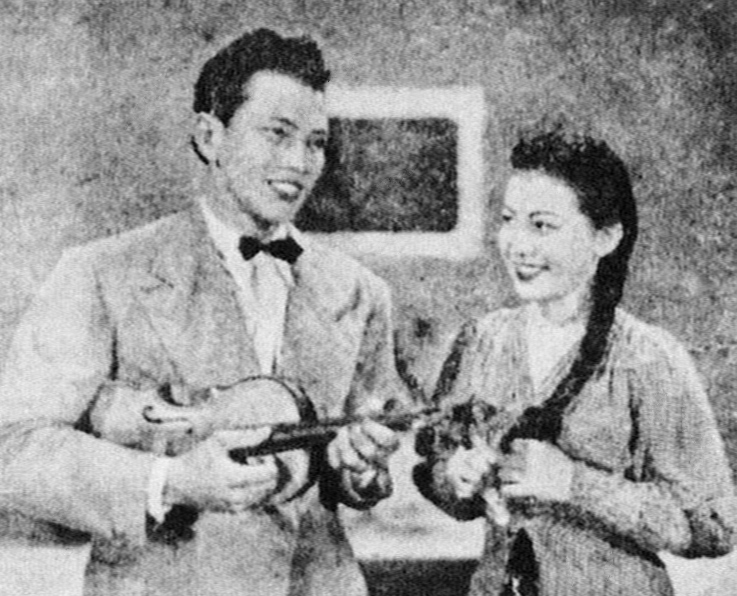
Kasma with P. Ramlee in 1950

Before becoming a film star, Kasma first worked as an actress and sang in bangsawan traditional musical theater with the troupe Asmara Dhana in Medan at the age of ten. Fourteen-year-old Kasma and her theater group, which had been renamed Rayuan Asmara, moved to Malaysia (at that time Malaya) and got jobs as bangsawan actress in Penang and Singapore to escape Japanese persecution. Here she no longer just sings, but also plays for films.

She began her film career by acting in a number of films produced by Shaw Brothers. Her movies at Shaw Brothers included Cempaka (1947) and Noor Asmara (1949). Kasma next moved to the Cathay Keris Studio in Singapore before moving to the Merdeka Studio in Hulu Kelang, Malaysia in the 1960s. She received the Merak Kayangan award for veteran, long time film stars at the seventh annual Malaysian Film Festival in 1987, as well being awarded the Jury Award at the 35th annual Asia Pacific Film Festival in 1990.

== Illness and death ==
Booty suffered from a number of medical conditions in her later years, including heart problems, diabetes, high blood pressure and pneumonia. She was admitted to Ampang Hospital, located in the suburb of Ampang near Kuala Lumpur on 13 May 2007, after complaining of shortness of breath due to pneumonia. While being hospitalised, she asked to visit Cameron Highlands in Pahang and Pulau Besar in Malacca. Unfortunately, her final wishes was never granted as she was unable to leave the hospital. According to an interview with her granddaughter, Jeng Riema Booty Purnama, Kasma had been well enough to eat some of her favourite foods in the hospital such as lontong, kentang putar and nasi kandar.

She died at 2 a.m on 1 June 2007 of pneumonia surrounded by her children. She was 75 at the time and left behind 12 grandchildren and two great grandchildren. Her body was buried at Kampung Klang Gate Cemetery.

== Filmography ==
Shaw Brothers Studios

Year	Title	Role	Notes
1948	Chempaka	Chempaka	
1948	Pisau Berachun		
1949	Noor Asmara	Zaharah	
1950	Rachun Dunia	Aminah	
1950	Bakti	Sa'adiyah	
1950	Dewi Murni	Dewi Murni	
1951	Sejoli	Mariam	
1951	Juwita	Juwita	
1951	Manusia		

Cathay Keris Studios

Year	Title	Role	Notes
1958	Mahsuri		

Merdeka Studios

Year	Title	Role	Notes
1961	Keris Sempena Riau		
1962	Selendang Merah		
1962	Siti Payung		
1962	Ratapan Ibu		
1963	Tangkap Basah		
1963	Anak Manja		
1964	Ragam P. Ramlee		
