= Ayer Kuning (state constituency) =

Political subdivision in Malaysia

Ayer Kuning (N48)
Perak constituency

State constituency
- Legislature: Perak State Legislative Assembly
MLA
Mohamad Yusri Bakir
BN
- Constituency created: 1986
- First contested: 1986
- Last contested: 2025

Demographics
- Population (2020): 44,452
- Electors (2025): 31,897

Ayer Kuning is a state constituency in Perak, Malaysia, that has been represented in the Perak State Legislative Assembly. It has been represented by Mohamad Yusri Bakir of Barisan Nasional (BN) since 2025.

== Demographics ==
Ethnic breakdown of Ayer Kuning's electorate as of 2022
1. Malay (55.6%)
2. Chinese (22.0%)
3. Indian (14.3%)
4. Other ethnicities (8.07%)

== History ==
=== Polling districts ===
According to the federal gazette issued on 31 October 2022, the Ayer Kuning constituency is divided into 20 polling districts.

State constituency	Polling Districts	Code	Location
Ayer Kuning (N48)	Temoh Stesyen	072/48/01	SK Temoh
Ayer Kuning (N48)	Sungai Lesong	072/48/02	SK Sungai Lesong
Ayer Kuning (N48)	Kampong Sungai Kurong	072/48/03	SK Sungai Lesong
Ayer Kuning (N48)	Sungai Keroh	072/48/04	SJK (C) Sungai Kroh
Ayer Kuning (N48)	Kampong Batu Mesjid	072/48/05	SK Batu Masjid
Ayer Kuning (N48)	Kampung Batu Tiga	072/48/06	SK Batu Tiga
Ayer Kuning (N48)	Banir	072/48/07	SJK (C) Hwa Lian
Ayer Kuning (N48)	Banir Utara	072/48/08	SJK (C) Hwa Lian
Ayer Kuning (N48)	Ayer Kuning	072/48/09	SK Ayer Kuning
Ayer Kuning (N48)	Ayer Kuning Selatan	072/48/10	SJK (C) Pheng Lok
Ayer Kuning (N48)	Tanjong Keramat	072/48/11	SA Rakyat Salamiah Kampung Tanjung Keramat
Ayer Kuning (N48)	Changkat Petai	072/48/12	SK Haji Hasan
Ayer Kuning (N48)	Tapah Road Timor	072/48/13	SJK (C) Phui Chen
Ayer Kuning (N48)	Tapah Road Utara	072/48/14	SMK Dato' Panglima Perang Kiri
Ayer Kuning (N48)	Kampong Raya	072/48/15	SK Toh Tandewa Sakti
Ayer Kuning (N48)	Pekan Getah	072/48/16	SJK (C) Pekan Getah
Ayer Kuning (N48)	Kampong Simpang Tiga	072/48/17	SMK Bidor; SMA Daerah Batang Padang
Ayer Kuning (N48)	Kampong Rahmat	072/48/18	SJK (T) Ladang Banopdane
Ayer Kuning (N48)	Jeram Mengkuang	072/48/19	SK Jeram Mengkuang
Ayer Kuning (N48)	Kampong Coldstream	072/48/20	SJK (C) Kampong Coldstream

=== Representation history ===
Perak State Legislative Assemblyman for Ayer Kuning
Assembly	No	Years	Member	Party
Constituency created from Tapah and Chenderiang
7th	N36	1986 – 1990	Azman Malahan	BN (UMNO)
8th	N36	1990–1995	Azman Malahan	BN (UMNO)
9th	N41	1995–1999	Azman Malahan	BN (UMNO)
10th	N41	1999–2004	Azman Malahan	BN (UMNO)
11th	N48	2004–2008	Samsudin Abu Hassan	BN (UMNO)
12th	N48	2008–2013	Samsudin Abu Hassan	BN (UMNO)
13th	N48	2013–2018	Samsudin Abu Hassan	BN (UMNO)
14th	N48	2018–2022	Samsudin Abu Hassan	BN (UMNO)
15th	N48	2022–2025	Ishsam Shahruddin	BN (UMNO)
15th	N48	2025–present	Mohamad Yusri Bakir	BN (UMNO)

== Election results ==
Perak state by-election, 26 April 2025 Upon the death of incumbent, Ishsam Shahruddin
Party	Candidate	Votes	%	∆%
BN	Mohamad Yusri Bakir	11,065	60.70	▲21.97
PN	Abdul Muhaimin Malek	6,059	33.23	▲4.20
Parti Sosialis Malaysia	Bawani Kaniapan	1,106	6.07	▲3.57
Total valid votes		18,230	100.00	
Total rejected ballots		289		
Unreturned ballots		4		
Turnout		18,523	58.07	▼16.78
Registered electors		31,897		
Majority		5,006	27.47	▲18.04
BN hold		Swing		

Perak state election, 2022
Party	Candidate	Votes	%	∆%
BN	Ishsam Shahruddin	9,088	38.73	▼8.90
PH	Mohd Nazri Hashim	6,875	29.30	▲29.30
PN	Muhamamd Noor Farid Zainal	6,812	29.03	▲29.03
Parti Sosialis Malaysia	Bawani Kaniapan	586	2.50	▲2.50
PEJUANG	Maziah Salim	105	0.45	▲0.45
Total valid votes		23,466	100.00	
Total rejected ballots		394		
Unreturned ballots		46		
Turnout		23,906	74.85	▼5.39
Registered electors		31,940		
Majority		2,213	9.43	▼1.44
BN hold		Swing		

Perak state election, 2018
Party	Candidate	Votes	%	∆%
BN	Samsudin Abu Hassan	9,141	47.63	▼9.69
PKR	Tan Seng Toh	7,054	36.76	▲36.76
PAS	Salmah Abdul Latiff	2,993	15.60	▼23.72
Total valid votes		19,188	97.46	
Total rejected ballots		409	2.08	
Unreturned ballots		71	0.36	
Turnout		19,688	80.24	▼1.56
Registered electors		24,537		
Majority		2,087	10.87	▼7.13
BN hold		Swing		
Source(s) "RESULTS OF CONTESTED ELECTION AND STATEMENTS OF THE POLL AFTER THE OFFICIAL ADDITION OF VOTES".

Perak state election, 2013
Party	Candidate	Votes	%	∆%
BN	Samsudin Abu Hassan	11,094	57.32	▼4.29
PAS	Ahmad Razi Othman	7,609	39.32	▲0.93
Independent	Kathiravan Murugan	297	1.53	▲1.53
Total valid votes		19,353	99.68	
Total rejected ballots		353		
Unreturned ballots		62		
Turnout		19,415	81.80	▲3.61
Registered electors		23,735		
Majority		3,485	18.00	▼5.22
BN hold		Swing		
Source(s) "KEPUTUSAN PILIHAN RAYA UMUM DEWAN UNDANGAN NEGERI". Archived from the original on 2017-05-01.

Perak state election, 2008
Party	Candidate	Votes	%	∆%
BN	Samsudin Abu Hassan	8,628	61.61	▼13.79
PAS	Ahmad Razi Othman	5,376	38.39	▲38.39
Total valid votes		14,004	96.71	
Total rejected ballots		477	3.29	
Unreturned ballots		0		
Turnout		14,481	78.19	▼8.85
Registered electors		20,232		
Majority		3,252	23.22	▼27.54
BN hold		Swing		
Source(s) "KEPUTUSAN PILIHAN RAYA UMUM DEWAN UNDANGAN NEGERI PERAK BAGI TAHUN 2008".

Perak state election, 2004
Party	Candidate	Votes	%	∆%
BN	Samsudin Abu Hassan	10,218	75.40	▲14.34
PKR	Mohamad Asri Othman	3,341	24.64	▼14.34
Total valid votes		13,559	95.00	
Total rejected ballots		409	2.87	
Unreturned ballots		304	2.13	
Turnout		14,272	69.34	▲4.49
Registered electors		20,584		
Majority		6,877	50.76	▼28.64
BN hold		Swing		
Source(s) "KEPUTUSAN PILIHAN RAYA UMUM DEWAN UNDANGAN NEGERI PERAK BAGI TAHUN 2008".

Perak state election, 1999
Party	Candidate	Votes	%	∆%
BN	Azman Malahan	8,168	61.06	▼10.71
PKR	Khalil Shah Jamaluddin	5,208	38.94	▲38.94
Total valid votes		13,376	95.40	
Total rejected ballots		435	3.10	
Unreturned ballots		210	1.50	
Turnout		14,021	64.85	▼1.86
Registered electors		21,620		
Majority		2,960	22.12	▼21.42
BN hold		Swing		
Source(s) "KEPUTUSAN PILIHAN RAYA UMUM DEWAN UNDANGAN NEGERI PERAK BAGI TAHUN 2008".

Perak state election, 1995
Party	Candidate	Votes	%	∆%
BN	Azman Malahan	9,466	71.77	▲5.32
S46	Abdul Wahab Abu Bakar	3,724	28.23	▼5.32
Total valid votes		13,190	94.56	
Total rejected ballots		573	4.11	
Unreturned ballots		186	1.33	
Turnout		13,949	66.71	▼2.27
Registered electors		20,910		
Majority		5,742	43.54	▲10.64
BN hold		Swing		
Source(s) "KEPUTUSAN PILIHAN RAYA UMUM DEWAN UNDANGAN NEGERI PERAK BAGI TAHUN 2008".

Perak state election, 1990
Party	Candidate	Votes	%	∆%
BN	Azman Malahan	7,627	66.45	▼12.15
S46	Ahmad Mustafa Abdullah	3,851	33.55	▲33.55
Total valid votes		11,478	95.82	
Total rejected ballots		501	4.18	
Unreturned ballots		0	0	
Turnout		11,979	68.98	▼0.17
Registered electors		17,366		
Majority		3,776	32.90	▼34.30
BN hold		Swing		
Source(s) "KEPUTUSAN PILIHAN RAYA UMUM DEWAN UNDANGAN NEGERI PERAK BAGI TAHUN 2008".

Perak state election, 1986
Party	Candidate	Votes	%
BN	Azman Malahan	8,506	78.60
PAS	Jamal Osman	1,234	11.40
SDP	Abu Bakar Mohd Taib	1,082	10.00
Total valid votes		10,822	94.62
Total rejected ballots		615	5.38
Unreturned ballots		0	0
Turnout		11,437	69.15
Registered electors		16,540	
Majority		7,272	67.20
This was a new constituency created.
Source(s) "KEPUTUSAN PILIHAN RAYA UMUM DEWAN UNDANGAN NEGERI PERAK BAGI TAHUN 2008".
