= Death of Zara Qairina Mahathir =

2025 death of a student in Sabah, Malaysia

- Date: 16 July 2025
- Location: Tun Datu Mustapha Islamic National Secondary School, Papar District, Sabah, Malaysia
- Cause: Disputed, believed to be based on bullying elements
- Burial: Kampung Kalamauh Mesapol, Sipitang District

In the early morning of 16 July 2025, Zara Qairina binti Mahathir, a Form 1 student of Tun Datu Mustapha Islamic National Secondary School in Papar, Sabah, died after allegedly falling from the third floor of her school dormitory. Early public speculation suggested that Zara may have been a victim of bullying at her school. Ongoing inquest proceedings and related investigations have since focused on determining the precise circumstances surrounding her death, including allegations of bullying and possible institutional failures.

== Background of the incident ==
At approximately 3 am on 16 July 2025, Zara Qairina was found unconscious near a drain at the girls' dormitory of Tun Datu Mustapha Islamic National Secondary School, where she studied, with no witnesses to the incident, although most of the other students were still awake. She was then sent to Queen Elizabeth Hospital the next morning, where she was put on life support due to a coma with severe injuries, including broken arms and legs. However, the next day, the hospital decided to stop her life support due to lack of brain function. She was later buried at her residence in Kampung Kalamauh Mesapol, Sipitang District.

== Investigations ==
A police report was first obtained in the morning shortly after Zara was found unconscious. The idea that bullying was involved began to be discussed on social media shortly after her death. On Sunday, police received a report from the next of kin at Papar district police headquarters regarding allegations that the principal wanted to prevent the initial reporting of Zara's death, as well as an official letter to the school demanding an explanation about her death. Regarding the principal, former school principal Rosnih Nasir, who is accused of being the wife of Deputy Minister of Higher Education Mustapha Sakmud, denied any connection to the incident, citing that she was only the principal from March to November of the previous year before retiring.

On 30 July, a post went viral on the Internet claiming that Zara's death was orchestrated by a group of bullies at her school who were related to political figures. Various parties, including the mother of the victim, the police and the Sabah government, denied the allegations of those figures' involvement.

Throughout the investigation process, as of early August, 60 people appeared as witnesses to assist the police investigation. On 3 August, the victim's mother, Noraidah Lamat, filed another police report on suspicion of finding bruises on the body while preparing the body for burial, with her lawyer calling for the body to be exhumed so that a post-mortem could be conducted following the discovery. The lawyers for the representatives also claimed that the police did not take the Zara clothes for forensic investigation purposes, thus contradicting normal practice in criminal investigations.

On 8 August 2025, the Attorney General of Malaysia ordered that Zara Qairina's grave be exhumed so that an autopsy could be conducted to identify the main cause of Zara Qairina's death. The exhumation process of the grave was carried out on 9 August 2025 and the cemetery area was tightly controlled by the police so that no untoward incident occurred. In addition, the media was also seen at the location to cover it. People were also seen crowding the location of Zara Qairina's grave. Prime Minister of Malaysia Anwar Ibrahim guaranteed that the investigation would be conducted transparently and fairly, and that no one would escape punishment if they were truly involved in the death of Zara Qairina.

Forensic pathologist of Queen Elizabeth Hospital, Jessie Hiu, told the inquest that it was unlikely that Zara's death was caused by accidental falling or by being pushed from a standing position. She also said that the hospital's chemistry department did not detect any drugs in Zara's liver based on the toxicology results. However, according to the Coroner's Court of Kota Kinabalu, laboratory tests detected the presence of the anti-seizure drug, Phenytoin in Zara's kidney tissue.

According to the head of discipline in the school, on 14 March 2025, a month after she first enrolled in the school, the unit received a complaint by Zara, alleging that she was sexually harassed by another student while sleeping in her dormitory.

== Trial and procedures ==
On 20 August 2025, five teenage girls were charged in the Kota Kinabalu Children's Court with bullying of Zara Qairina Mahathir. The accused, all minors, were charged under Section 507C(1) of the Penal Code with making threatening or insulting communications towards Zara, an offence carrying a penalty of up to one year’s imprisonment, a fine, or both. All five pleaded not guilty before Judge Elsie Primus and were released on bail of RM5,000 (US$1,200) each. A gag order was imposed under the Child Act 2001 to protect their identities.

The Attorney-General's Chambers stated that the charge relates specifically to bullying and is not linked to Zara's death, which remains the subject of a separate inquest. The inquest, scheduled to begin on 3 September 2025, was ordered after public outcry over the initial police investigation, which had closed the case without a post-mortem examination.

On 17 May 2026, the Coroner’s Court heard the testimony of Nur Shira Abdullah, Zara’s aunt and sister-in-law to Zara’s mother, Noraidah Lamat, regarding visible injuries and bruising observed on Zara’s body during treatment and funeral preparations at Queen Elizabeth Hospital on 17 July 2025. Nur Shira testified that she observed extensive injuries while viewing the body at the hospital and during funeral management procedures. According to her testimony, part of Zara’s head had been shaved, and the area near the shaved section felt soft with what appeared to be fluid beneath the skin, although no large open wounds or stitched injuries were visible. Nur Shira further stated that extensive bruising was present on Zara’s back, particularly around the rib area, forming a long linear dark bluish-black mark extending from the waist to the shoulder. Additional fine bruise-like markings were reportedly visible across the back, while the left arm and left leg were bandaged. She also noted that the body appeared yellowish in colour and that the left ankle appeared dislocated, though no protruding bones were seen.

== Responses ==
Saifuddin Abdullah, Member of Parliament for Indera Mahkota, brought the issue of Zara's death to the Malaysian Parliament, where he called for questions about the manner of Zara's death, the alleged attempt to cover up the case and influence the investigation to be answered immediately. Prime Minister Anwar Ibrahim insisted on the parties involved to conduct the investigation transparently, including discussing with Inspector-General of Police Mohd Khalid Ismail and Home Minister Saifuddin Nasution Ismail, to expedite the investigation. The Education Ministry also urged the public to not gather in front of or boycotting the school.

Former Prime Minister Mahathir Mohamad expressed hope that the case of Zara Qairina could be resolved based on the "rule of law". He said that if this principle was not upheld, the situation would descend into chaos.

The case caused nationwide outrage with many people demanded justice for her death and anti bullying reforms. In response, several rallies and protests have occurred all over the country, including in Kedah, Kelantan, Kuala Lumpur, Labuan, Malacca, Pahang, Perak, and Sabah.

== Analysis ==
One analyst argued that public sentiment currently hinges on whether authorities demonstrate transparency and accountability in handling the case. Associate Professor Dr. Syahruddin Awang Ahmad of Universiti Malaysia Sabah told the New Straits Times that due to perceived lapses, such as the lack of an initial autopsy, the public have already eroded trust in the government and police, and he warned that failure to address these concerns could significantly impact the credibility of the current administration in voters' eyes.

== See also ==
- Murder of Zulfarhan Osman Zulkarnain
- Murder of Zayn Rayyan
