= ITV =

ITV or iTV may refer to:

== Television ==
- iTV, the pre-release codename for the Apple TV home media product
- Instructional television, the use of television programmes in distance education
- Interactive television (iTV), television which allows the exchange of information between the sender and the receiver
- Internet television (Internet TV or iTV), television distributed via the Internet (instead of being 'broadcast' via radio waves)
- ITV, interference by television, Television interference

=== ITV ===
- Independent Television (ITV), a British television network and company, including:
  - ITV (TV network), a free-to-air national commercial television network in the United Kingdom, the Isle of Man, and the Channel Islands, made up of separate regional broadcasters
  - ITV1, formerly ITV, a television channel broadcasting on the majority of the ITV network, covering England, Southern Scotland, Wales, Northern Ireland, the Isle of Man, and the Channel Islands
  - ITV plc, ITV1's parent company, which owns 13 of the 15 ITV network licences
  - itv.com, the main website of ITV plc
  - ITVX, streaming service operated by ITV plc
  - ITV News, ITV news programmes
    - ITN, the Independent Television News production and broadcast journalism company
  - ITV Studios, a television production company owned by ITV plc
- Independent Television (Tanzania), a Tanzanian television station and member of the Commonwealth Broadcasting Association (CBA)
- CITV-DT, a television station in Edmonton, Alberta, Canada
- Internacia Televido, the first Esperanto-language television station, internet-based, defunct from 2006
- Information Television Network, an American television production company based in Florida
- ITV Network (India), a media group
- Independent Television (Bangladesh), a Bangladeshi television news channel

=== iTV ===
- iTV (Hong Kong Telecom), a video-on-demand multimedia interactive television service launched in March 1998, now defunct
- iTV (Thailand), a Thai television station, renamed in 2007 as TITV, now defunct and replaced by Thai Public Broadcasting Service
- iTV, formerly a Vietnamese interactive music channel, owned by Vietnam Multimedia Corporation
- i-Television, a television station in Ehime Prefecture, Japan
- i: Independent Television, now called Ion Television, an American free-to-air television network
- İctimai Television, an Azerbaijani public independent television station, based in Baku

== Other uses ==
- ITV Parapentes, a defunct French aircraft manufacturer
- Inspección Técnica de Vehículos, the Spanish motor vehicle inspection
- M901 ITV ('Improved TOW Vehicle'), an armored, mobile missile launcher of the U.S. Army

== See also ==
- ITVS (Independent Television Service)
- lTV (disambiguation)
- 1TV (disambiguation)
- TV (disambiguation)
- IT (disambiguation)
- Independent Television (disambiguation)
