= Independent Television =

Independent television can refer to:

== In general ==
- Independent station, a terrestrial television station not affiliated to networks
- Private television, television not associated with the government

== Entities ==
- Africa Independent Television, a Nigerian satellite television station
- Independent Television (Bangladesh), a Bangladeshi 24/7 news channel
- Independent Television (Tanzania), a Tanzanian television channel
- Independent Television Act (UK)
  - Independent Television, a British television network:
    - ITV (TV network), Independent Television, a television network covering the United Kingdom, the Isle of Man and the Channel Islands
    - ITV (TV channel), former brand name used by ITV plc for twelve franchises of the ITV Network covering England, Southern Scotland, Wales, the Isle of Man and the Channel Islands (now known as ITV1)
    - ITV Digital, a UK digital terrestrial TV broadcaster, which opened in 1998 as ONdigital and closed in 2002
    - ITV plc, a British company which owns thirteen of the fifteen ITV Network franchises
    - ITV Studios, a production company owned by ITV plc
    - itv.com, the main website of ITV plc
  - ITC Entertainment (Independent Television Corporation)
  - Independent Television Authority (UK government)
- Ion Television, U.S. network, previously called i: Independent Television
- Televisão Independente, a Portuguese television channel
- Televisão Independente de Moçambique, a defunct Mozambian television channel
- Independent TV (India), Indian direct to home operator
- Independent Television Network, a Sri Lankan state-owned broadcaster
- Network 10, an Australian television network launched as Independent Television System

== See also ==
- Independent (disambiguation)
- Television (disambiguation)
- TV (disambiguation)
- IT (disambiguation)
- ITV (disambiguation)
