= 2026 Sukma Games =

Multi-sport event in Selangor, Malaysia

XXII Sukma Games
- Host city: Selangor
- Motto: Rentak Kita, Aksi Kita (Our Rhythm, Our Action)
- Teams: 15
- Athletes: 9,407
- Events: 468 in 37 sports (46 disciplines)
- Opening: 15 August
- Closing: 24 August
- Opened by: Crown Prince Tengku Amir Shah
- Closed by: Crown Prince Tengku Amir Shah
- Athlete's Oath: Muhammad Aiman Syahin Sulaiman
- Torch lighter: Marilyn Chua, Farah Ann Abdul Hadi and Andrew Goh
- Main venue: Shah Alam Independence Square (Opening ceremony); Aneka Walk (Closing ceremony)
- Website: selangor2026.com

The 2026 Sukma Games (Malay: Sukan Malaysia 2026), officially known as the XXII Sukma Games (Malay: Sukan Malaysia XXII) and also known as Selangor 2026 was a national multi-sport event that took place in the state of Selangor from 15 to 24 August 2026, although track cycling was held in Nilai, Seremban, Negeri Sembilan. This was Selangor's second time to host the Sukma Games, having previously done so in 1998.

== Host selection ==
On 18 July 2024, Selangor offered itself to take the place of the National Sports Council as it already had adequate facilities in place, and were chosen as host during the supreme committee meeting in Kuala Lumpur. This host selection was based on the new rotation system agreed between National Sports Council and the individual State Sports Councils on 17 March 2023.

== Development and preparations ==
A total of RM100 million out of the RM203 million in budget were originally allocated by the state government for the games. However, due to tight economic conditions resulted mainly from the Middle East conflicts, the state government reduced the cost by 67 percent to just RM50 million, mainly involving the opening and closing ceremonies that were eventually held at modest scale. Plans to hold the opening ceremony at the Sepang International Circuit on a grand scale had also been scrapped, and instead it was held at Shah Alam Independence Square in Shah Alam City Centre. Additionally, the number of volunteers were reduced from more than 30,000 to fewer than 5,000, although their allowances remained unchanged. Nearly RM8 million secured via corporate sponsorships and the youth and sports ministry provided an estimated RM1.75 million to ensure the smooth organisation of the games.

Unlike previous Sukma Editions, there were no designated Games Village for the event. Instead, a total of 471 accommodations and 15 university hostels across the state will also be used by the contingents, to create economic opportunities for hotel operators, homestay providers and local businesses. Each participating athletes are also given RM100 subsidies per day.

68 catering companies were also hired to provide food for officials and athletes throughout the Games period, while 12 companies will be providing transportations for officials and athletes and other participants.

=== Venues ===
City	Competition Venue	Sports
Petaling District Cluster
Shah Alam
Shah Alam	Shah Alam Independence Square	Opening ceremony
Shah Alam	Aneka Walk	Closing ceremony
Shah Alam	Selangor Aquatics Centre	Aquatics (Diving, Swimming, Water Polo)
Shah Alam	Setia City Convention Centre, Hall 1 and 2	Badminton
Shah Alam	UiTM Stadium	Football (Men)
Shah Alam	UiTM Sports Centre Hall	Fencing
Shah Alam	Youth and Sports Complex (KOMBES)	Futsal (Men, Women)
Shah Alam	Sportiza Batu Tiga	Futsal (Women)
Shah Alam	MBSA Tanjung Grand Hall, Section 19	Volleyball (Indoor)
Shah Alam	MBSA Section 4 Volleyball Hall	Volleyball (Indoor)
Shah Alam	MBSA Section 19 Beach Volleyball Court	Volleyball (Beach)
Shah Alam	Glenmarie Golf Club	Golf
Shah Alam	Ideal Convention Centre Shah Alam	Judo, Karate, Taekwondo, Wushu
Petaling Jaya
Petaling Jaya	MBPJ Extreme Park	Cycling (BMX)
Petaling Jaya	Petaling Jaya Stadium	Football (Men)
Petaling Jaya	MBPJ Hockey Stadium	Field Hockey (Women)
Petaling Jaya	National Shooting Range, Subang	Shooting
Petaling Jaya	MBPJ Pavillion Sports Complex	Squash
Petaling Jaya	Kelana Jaya Sports Complex	Tennis
Petaling Jaya	SSDC Sports Complex	Tennis
Subang Jaya
Subang Jaya	MBSJ Stadium, Serdang Jaya	Kabaddi, Silambam
Subang Jaya	Selangor Turf Club	Cricket (Men)
Subang Jaya	MBSJ Arena, Puchong	Sepak Takraw
Subang Jaya	Sunway Megalanes, Sunway Pyramid	Bowling
Subang Jaya	University of Putra Malaysia Stadium	Athletics (Track and Field)
Klang District Cluster
Klang
Klang	Bukit Tinggi Basketball Court 2	Basketball (5×5 and 3×3)
Klang	Bayuemas Lawn Bowls Complex	Lawn Bowls
Klang	Pandamaran Hockey Stadium	Field hockey (Men and Women)
Klang	Bayuemas Cricket Oval	Cricket (Men)
Klang	KSL Esplanade Mall	Muay Thai
Klang	MBDK Hall, Bukit Raja	Table tennis
Klang	Sultan Suleiman Field	Rugby sevens
Sepang District Cluster
Sepang
Sepang	Bagan Lalang Route	Cycling (Road)
Sepang	Bandar Baru Stadium, Salak Tinggi	Football (Men)
Gombak District Cluster
Selayang	Selayang Municipal Council Stadium	Football (Women)
Ampang Jaya	MPAJ Convention Centre	E-sports
Hulu Langat District Cluster
Kajang
Kajang	National Review Institute	Archery
Kajang	Seri Cempaka Community Hall, Saujana Impian	Weightlifting
Kajang	National University of Malaysia Stadium	Football (Men)
Kajang	Tun Abdul Razak Chancellory Hall, National University of Malaysia	Gymnastics (Artistic and Rhythmic)
Kajang	National University of Malaysia Cricket Oval	Cricket (Men and Women)
Kajang	National University of Malaysia Softball Field	Softball
Kajang	Tun Abdullah Mohd Salleh Hall, National University of Malaysia	Boxing
Kajang	Seri Saujana Hall, Universiti Tenaga Nasional	Pencak silat
Kuala Langat District Cluster
Kuala Langat	Batu Laut Sailing Training Centre	Sailing
Hulu Selangor District Cluster
Kuala Kubu Bharu	Hulu Selangor Municipal Council Stadium	Football (Women)
Kuala Selangor District Cluster
Kuala Selangor
Kuala Selangor	Agro Park Farmers Valley	Cycling (Mountain biking)
Kuala Selangor	Kuala Selangor Indoor Stadium	Netball
Kuala Selangor	Kuala Selangor Petanque Arena	Petanque
Sabak Bernam District Cluster
Sabak Bernam	Seri Bernam Hall	Chess
Seremban District, Negeri Sembilan (Outside Selangor)
Seremban	Velodrom Nasional Malaysia, Nilai	Cycling (Track cycling)

=== Torch relay ===
From 10 May until 9 August, the Games torch travelled across 12 municipalities in Selangor, spanning a total of 92 days or 13 weeks.

2026 SUKMA Games torch relay stops

No.	Venue	City, District	Date
1	Shah Alam Independence Square	Shah Alam, Petaling	10 May 2026
2	Laman Seni Safari	Klang, Klang	24 May 2026
3	Malawati Square	Kuala Selangor, Kuala Selangor	6 June 2026
4	Bagan Terap Square	Sabak Bernam, Sabak Bernam	14 June 2026
5	Town Heritage Square	Kuala Kubu Bharu, Hulu Selangor	21 June 2026
6	Selayang Municipal Council Stadium	Selayang, Gombak	27 June 2026
7	MPAJ Convention Centre	Ampang Jaya, Gombak	5 July 2026
8	Kajang Square/Kajang Stadium	Kajang, Kajang	12 July 2026
9	MBSJ Arena	Subang Jaya, Petaling	19 July 2026
10	Laman MBPJ	Petaling Jaya, Petaling	26 July 2026
11	Batu Laut Beach	Kuala Langat, Kuala Langat	2 August 2026
12	D'Pulze Cyberjaya	Cyberjaya, Sepang	9 August 2026

== Marketing ==
The official logo, motto and mascots were unveiled at the Crown Prince Musa Hall (Malay: Dewan Raja Muda Musa) in Shah Alam during the 1-year countdown celebration on 15 August 2025.

=== Logo ===
The design of the Games logo resembles a stylised torch with flame in the Colours of the Selangor State Flag, red and yellow; and the torch body that consists of the roman number XXII (22) in black, symbolising Selangor as the host of the 22nd Sukma Games and the spirit of Sportsmanship.

=== Mascots ===
Sakti

Seri

A couple of male and female White-bellied sea eagle (or Helang Laut Putih in Malay; later named Sakti and Seri respectively) were unveiled as mascots to represent strength and the spirit of youth, as well as maturity and high spirit and potential. They are mostly white in appearance with brown upperparts and wearing sports attire that consists of the colours of Selangor Flag red, yellow and white. The introduction of male and female mascot designs symbolises the Games emphasise on unity and inclusivity and athlete synergy.

Separately, Sakti (Male) represents bravery, extraordinary power, and an unbreakable fighting spirit, while Seri (female) symbolising excellence, elegance, confidence, and agility.

=== Motto and Theme Song ===
The motto for the Games "Rentak Kita, Aksi Kita" (Our Rhythm, Our Action) was chosen to symbolise the spirit of unity and the resolution to achieve sporting excellence. On 6 June 2026, an eponymous theme song sung by Azlan & Typewriter and Balan Kash was unveiled alongside the names of the mascot during the third torch relay stop at Malawati Square in Kuala Selangor.

=== Medal design ===
The 2026 SUKMA Games medals featured the torch flame logo, the mascots and the state map of Selangor (with nine districts) on the obverse side. The name of the event as well as the motto are also carved on the periphery of the medal. The reverse side featured 25 stars, the state flower Bunga Tanjung Pecah Sembilan or nine-petalled bulletwood flower (Mimusops elengi) and the state mosque – Sultan Salahuddin Abdul Aziz Shah Mosque.

=== Corporate sponsorship ===
Sponsors of the 2026 SUKMA and Para SUKMA Games
Partners
- Teto Engineering (Supporting)
- Siara TV (Official broadcaster)
Platinum sponsors
- Menteri Besar Incorporated
- Selangor State Development Corporation
- Permodalan Negeri Selangor Berhad
- Selangor Agricultural Development Corporation
- Milo Malaysia
Gold sponsors
- Koridor Utiliti Selangor
- InfraSel
- Ideal Convention Centre
- MESUMA Marathon
- Setia City Convention Centre
Silver sponsors
- Yonex Sunrise
- Airbnb
Bronze sponsors
- KDEB Waste Management
- 100plus
- Innotex
- Wyndham Acmar Klang
- Shah Alam Convention Centre
- Molten Malaysia

== The Games ==
=== Participating teams ===
Participating State Sports Councils
- Johor (686)
- Kedah (522)
- Kelantan (594)
- Malacca (530)
- Negeri Sembilan (562)
- Pahang (743)
- Penang (691)
- Perak (800)
- Perlis (385)
- Sabah (748)
- Sarawak (791)
- Selangor (host) (865)
- Terengganu (612)
- Federal Territories (825)
- Brunei (53)

==== Number of athletes by State Sports Council ====
Ranking	State	Athletes
1	Selangor	865
2	Federal Territories	825
3	Perak	800
4	Sarawak	791
5	Sabah	748
6	Pahang	743
7	Penang	691
8	Johor	686
9	Terengganu	612
10	Kelantan	594
11	Negeri Sembilan	562
12	Malacca	530
13	Kedah	522
14	Perlis	385
15	Brunei	53

=== Sports ===
The SUKMA 2026 Supreme Special Committee had initially listed 474 events across 46 disciplines in 37 sports. But due to insufficient participation and entry requirements from states, five Artistic Swimming events were dropped from the final event list.

- Aquatics
  - Diving (12)
  - Swimming (41)
  - Water polo (2)
- Archery (14)
- Athletics (47)
- Badminton (7)
- Basketball
  - Basketball (2)
  - 3×3 basketball (2)
- Bowling (11)
- Boxing (11)
- Chess (12)
- Cricket (3)
- Cycling
  - BMX racing (4)
  - Mountain biking (4)
  - Road (10)
  - Track (10)
- Esports (13)
- Fencing (12)
- Field hockey (2)
- Football
  - Football (2)
  - Futsal (2)
- Golf (4)
- Gymnastics
  - Artistic (14)
  - Rhythmic (3)
- Judo (13)
- Kabaddi (2)
- Karate (15)
- Lawn bowls (9)
- Muay Thai (12)
- Netball (1)
- Pencak silat (28)
- Petanque (7)
- Rugby sevens (2)
- Sailing (10)
- Sepak takraw (8)
- Shooting (27)
- Silambam (14)
- Squash (4)
- Softball (2)
- Taekwondo (16)
- Table tennis (7)
- Tennis (7)
- Volleyball
  - Volleyball (2)
  - Beach volleyball (2)
- Weightlifting (16)
- Wushu (20)

=== Calendar ===
OC	Opening ceremony	●	Event competition	1	Gold medal events	CC	Closing ceremony

August 2026		11th Tue	12th Wed	13th Thu	14th Fri	15th Sat	16th Sun	17th Mon	18th Tue	19th Wed	20th Thu	21st Fri	22nd Sat	23rd Sun	24th Mon	Events
Ceremonies						OC									CC	
Aquatics	Diving									2	3	3	2	2		12
Aquatics	Swimming									8	9	8	8	8		41
Aquatics	Water polo		●	●	●	●	●	2								2
Archery								2	2	●	4	3	3			14
Athletics							10	10	10	8	9					47
Badminton						●	●	●	●	●	2	●	●	●	5	7
Basketball	Basketball				●	●	●	●	●	●	●	●	●	2		2
Basketball	3x3 Basketball		●	2												2
Bowling								2	2	1	2	2	2			11
Boxing							●	●	●	●	●	●	5	6		11
Chess				●	●	●	4	4	4							12
Cricket		●	●	●	●	●	●	●	1	●	●	●	1	●	1	3
Cycling	Road cycling						2	2	3	3						10
Cycling	Track cycling												6	4		10
Cycling	BMX											4				4
Cycling	Mountain biking				2	2										4
Esports										1	3	4	1	4		13
Fencing										2	2	2	3	3		12
Field hockey						●	●	●	●	●	●	●	●	2		2
Football	Football	●	●	●	●	●	●	●	●	1	●		1			2
Football	Futsal					●	●	●	●	●	1	1				2
Golf									●	●	4					4
Gymnastics	Artistic										2	2	5	5		14
Gymnastics	Rhythmic				1	2										3
Judo					4	5	4									13
Kabaddi					●	●	●	●	2							2
Karate												6	7	2		15
Lawn bowls						●	●	●	4	1	●	●	●	4		9
Muay Thai										●	●	●	●	12		12
Netball								●	●	●	●	●	1			1
Pencak silat					●	●	8	●	●	20						28
Petanque							●	2	●	2	●	3				7
Rugby sevens											●	●	●	2		2
Sailing									●	●	●	●	10			10
Sepak takraw						●	●	●	2	●	●	4	●	2		8
Shooting								6	7	6	5	3				27
Silambam													4	4	6	14
Softball							●	●	●	●	●	2				2
Squash							●	●	2	●	●	2				4
Table tennis									●	●	2	●	●	5		7
Taekwondo					4	6	6									16
Tennis								●	●	2	●	●	●	5		7
Volleyball	Beach volleyball	●	●	●	●	2										2
Volleyball	Volleyball							●	●	●	●	●	●	2		2
Weightlifting							3	3	3	4	3					16
Wushu											2	2	3	13		20
Daily medal events		0	0	2	11	17	37	33	42	61	53	51	62	87	12	468
Cumulative total		0	0	2	13	30	67	100	142	203	256	307	369	456	468	468
August 2026		11th Tue	12th Wed	13th Thu	14th Fri	15th Sat	16th Sun	17th Mon	18th Tue	19th Wed	20th Thu	21st Fri	22nd Sat	23rd Sun	24th Mon	Events

== Medal table ==
- 468 medal sets on offer
- Gold Medal ties in Artistic Gymnastics (no silver medal awarded)
  - Men's Horizontal bar (+1)
  - Men's Parallel Bars (+1)
  - Men's Rings (+1)
  - Men's Floor Exercise (+1)
  - Men's Individual All-Around (+1)
- Gold Medal tie in Silambam (no silver medal awarded)
  - Women's Individual Thanithiramai Silambam Stick (+1)
- Silver Medal tie in Silambam (no bronze medal awarded)
  - Men's Individual Thanithiramai Silambam Stick (+1)
- Bronze Medal tie in Artistic Gymnastics
  - Men's Horizontal bar (+1)
  - Men's Parallel Bars (+2)
  - Men's Rings (+1)
  - Women's Floor Exercise (+1)
  - Women's Individual All-Around (+1)
- Two Bronze medals awarded in Boxing (+11), Judo (+13), Karate (+15), Muay Thai (+12), Pencak Silat (+28), Silambam (+8), Taekwondo (+16) and Wushu (+8)

* Host nation (Selangor)

Rank	Team	Gold	Silver	Bronze	Total
1	Selangor*	101	73	71	245
2	Federal Territories	51	54	52	157
3	Terengganu	43	44	36	123
4	Sarawak	41	40	62	143
5	Penang	39	55	62	156
6	Johor	36	52	46	134
7	Perak	32	36	51	119
8	Sabah	30	27	36	93
9	Pahang	28	19	36	83
10	Malacca	21	12	17	50
11	Perlis	17	7	18	42
12	Kedah	14	22	46	82
13	Kelantan	14	6	16	36
14	Negeri Sembilan	7	12	29	48
15	Brunei	0	4	6	10
Totals (15 entries)		474	463	584	1,521

=== Medals distributed by sport ===
No.	Sport		Gold	Silver	Bronze	Total	Ref
1	Aquatics	Diving	12	12	12	36	
1	Aquatics	Swimming	41	41	41	123	
1	Aquatics	Water polo	2	2	2	6	
2	Archery		14	14	14	42	
3	Athletics		47	47	47	141	
4	Badminton		7	7	7	21	
5	Basketball	Basketball	2	2	2	6	
5	Basketball	3x3 basketball	2	2	2	6	
6	Bowling		11	11	11	33	
7	Boxing		11	11	22	44	
8	Chess		10	10	10	30	
9	Cricket		3	3	3	9	
10	Cycling	BMX racing	4	4	4	12	
10	Cycling	Mountain biking	4	4	4	12	
10	Cycling	Road	10	10	10	30	
10	Cycling	Track	10	10	10	30	
11	Esports		13	13	13	39	
12	Fencing		12	12	12	36	
13	Field hockey		2	2	2	6	
14	Football	Football	2	2	2	6	
14	Football	Futsal	2	2	2	6	
15	Golf		4	4	4	12	
16	Gymnastics	Artistic	19	9	20	48	
16	Gymnastics	Rhythmic	3	3	3	9	
17	Judo		13	13	26	52	
18	Kabaddi		2	2	2	6	
19	Karate		15	15	30	60	
20	Lawn bowls		9	9	9	27	
21	Muay Thai		12	12	24	48	
22	Netball		1	1	1	3	
23	Pencak silat		28	28	56	112	
24	Petanque		7	7	7	21	
25	Rugby sevens		2	2	2	6	
26	Sailing		10	10	10	30	
27	Sepak takraw		8	8	8	24	
28	Shooting		27	27	27	81	
29	Silambam		15	14	21	50	
30	Softball		2	2	2	6	
31	Squash		4	4	4	12	
32	Table tennis		7	7	7	21	
33	Taekwondo		16	16	32	64	
34	Tennis		7	7	7	21	
35	Volleyball	Volleyball	2	2	2	6	
35	Volleyball	Beach volleyball	2	2	2	6	
36	Weightlifting		16	16	16	48	
37	Wushu		20	20	28	68	

=== National, Games and Meet Records ===
No.	Sport		National Record (NR)	Sukma Record (SR)	Games Record (GR)	Meet Record (MR)	Ref
1	Aquatics	Swimming	2	0	0	12	
2	Archery		0	5	0	0	
3	Athletics		0	0	0	10	
4	Cycling	Track	2	0	0	0	
5	Shooting		0	0	6	0	

== Concerns and controversies ==
=== Before the Games ===
==== University athletics track quality issues ====
Concerns regarding the University of Putra Malaysia (UPM) Stadium track in Serdang, Subang Jaya, Selangor had faced intense scrutiny prior to the games. On 18 June 2026, athletics officials warned that the Stadium's newly laid Beynon track already appeared worn out, making it poorly optimised for high-level multi-contingent tournaments.

=== During the Games ===
==== Mid-competition athlete fatigue ====
More than six endurance athletes suffered severe heat fatigue, dehydration, and heat exhaustion on the athletics track at the University of Putra Malaysia Stadium on 17 August 2026. The incidents occurred during the men's and women's 3,000m steeplechase events, which were scheduled at 4:00 PM under blistering afternoon temperatures exceeding 33°C. Among the affected athletes was Selangor runner Siti Nur Fatihah Mohamad Adham, who collapsed just 30 metres away from the finish line after missing her final hurdle.

State contingent track coaches and officials stated that they had previously objected to holding heavy endurance events in the peak afternoon heat, but their scheduling concerns were ignored. Following the incident, they openly criticised the Games Secretariat (Organising Committee), after which the latter updated their standard operating procedures (SOPs).

==== Judging and Officiating Disputes in Combat Sports ====
The final days of the Silambam disciplines were hit with major protests from team officials. A massive uproar erupted from the stands during the mixed synchronised bare hand event, with teams openly accusing judges of shifting rules mid-tournament and displaying favouritism, leading to formal written protests over standardisation.

Across multiple other martial arts such as Muay Thai, state contingents expressed deep dissatisfaction over inconsistent refereeing and highly subjective point allocation, sparking calling for better transparency ahead of future editions.

==== The Unregistered Player Disqualification ====
A major technical drama shook the rugby sevens tournament on 23 August 2026 when Terengganu inadvertently fielded a player who was not officially registered on the semi-final roster. Sarawak immediately lodged an official protest. The technical committee upheld the protest, disqualifying Terengganu from competing for the gold medal (as well as forfeiting its 20 points to opponents) and advancing Sarawak straight to the final.

==== Toned-Down Atmosphere and Fake Holiday Rumours ====
Public social media backlash targeted the host state for a perceived lack of vibrancy and hype during the opening ceremonies compared to previous iterations. Officials had to publicly defend the event, pointing out that stripping away elements like ceremonial fireworks was a necessary byproduct of the state's budget discipline.

As Selangor closed in on the championship, fake viral posters circulated across social media declaring an immediate celebratory public holiday. This forced Selangor Menteri Besar Datuk Seri Amirudin Shari to issue urgent public statements debunking the misinformation until the final medal tally was certified.

== See also ==
- 2026 Para Sukma Games

Preceded by Sarawak	Sukma Games; Selangor; XXII Sukma Games (2026)	Succeeded by Kelantan
