= TVS =

TVS may refer to:

== Broadcasting ==
- Television Sydney, a defunct television channel in Sydney, Australia
- Television South, ITV franchise holder in the South of England between 1982 and 1992
- TVS Television Network, US distributor of live programming (mostly sports), in the 1960s and 1970s
- TVS (Poland), a regional Silesia commercial DVB-T free-to-air television station
- TVS (Russia), a defunct Russian television channel
- TV Syd, a Danish government-owned radio and television public broadcasting company
- TVS China, also known as Southern Television Guangdong, a regional television network
- TVS (Venezuela), Venezuelan regional television channel based in the city of Maracay
- TVS, former name of the Brazilian channel Sistema Brasileiro de Televisão
- Television Saitama, a television station in Saitama Prefecture, Japan
- TVS (São Tomé and Príncipe), the public television broadcaster of São Tomé and Príncipe
- TVS (Malaysian TV channel), a Malaysian television channel

== Businesses ==
- TVS Group, an Indian conglomerate
  - TVS Electronics, a computer peripherals manufacturer
  - TVS Motor, a motorcycle manufacturer

== Literature ==
- The Virgin Suicides, a 1993 novel by Jeffrey Eugenides

== People ==
- T. V. Sundram Iyengar (1877–1955), Indian industrialist
- T. V. Sankaranarayanan (1945–2022), Indian singer

== Places ==
- IATA code for Tangshan Sannühe Airport
- Trinity Valley School, a private school in Fort Worth, Texas

== Science, technology and mathematics ==
- Topological vector space
- Transvaginal ultrasound
- Transient voltage suppressor, an electronic component used for surge protection
- Transient-voltage-suppression diode, a diode used for surge protection
- Triggered vacuum switch, a type of krytron
- Tornado vortex signature

== See also ==
- Televisions (or TVs)
- TV (disambiguation)
