= Velodrom Nasional Malaysia =

Sporting facility in Malaysia

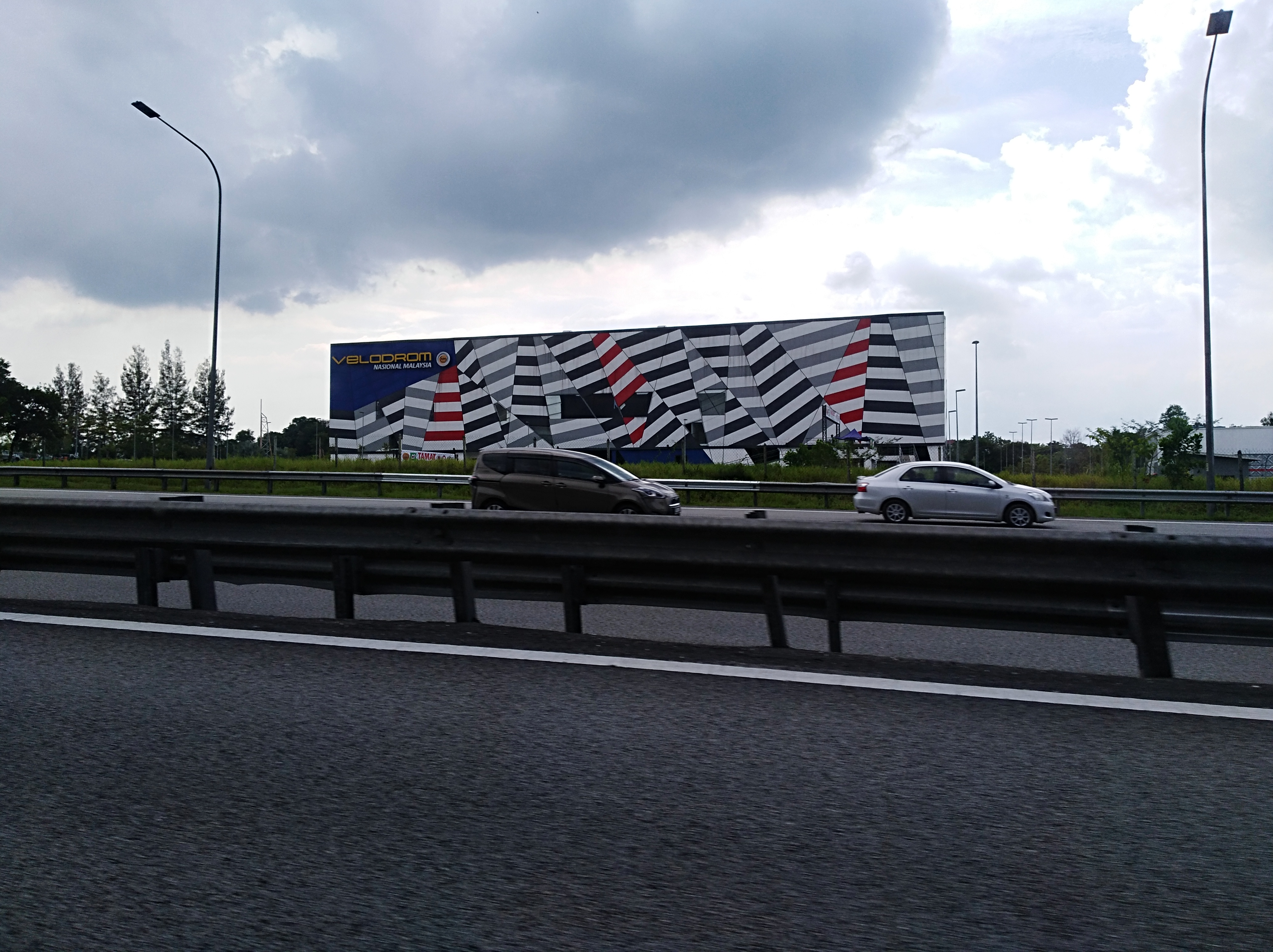
- The exterior of the velodrome as seen from North–South Expressway.
- Interactive map of Velodrom Nasional Malaysia
- Location: Nilai, Negeri Sembilan, Malaysia
- Coordinates: 2.842648°N 101.786434°E
- Owner: Government of Malaysia
- Operator: National Sports Council of Malaysia
- Capacity: 2,000 (including 200 standing)
- Surface: Siberian spruce wood
- Field size: 250 m (270 yd) track
- Acreage: 12

Construction
- Built: January 2015; 11 years ago
- Opened: 25 May 2017; 9 years ago
- Cost: MYR 80 million
- Architect: Arkitek Aliran Cipta Sdn Bhd
- Project manager: Malaysian Public Works Department
- Main contractor: Blackfox Engineering Sdn Bhd

Tenant
- National Sports Council of Malaysia

Velodrom Nasional Malaysia (English: Malaysian National Velodrome) is a sporting facility located in Nilai, Negeri Sembilan, Malaysia. The velodrome is the first indoor velodrome in Southeast Asia. It replaces the 28-year-old Velodrome Rakyat in Ipoh, Perak, which is being upgraded and the 30-year-old Cheras Velodrome in Kuala Lumpur, which will be demolished to make way for commercial development, as the nation's track cycling hub.

== Background ==
Construction of the velodrome started in January 2015 and was handed to the Ministry of Youth and Sports Malaysia on 20 May 2017. The velodrome was officially opened on 25 May 2017. Five Malaysian cycling legends, namely, Rosman Alwi, Josiah Ng, Ng Joo Ngan, M.Kumaresan and Azizulhasni Awang were given the honor of opening the velodrome. The ceremony was witnessed by Negeri Sembilan Menteri Besar Dato' Seri Utama Haji Mohamad bin Hasan, Youth and Sports Minister Khairy Jamaluddin and the Minister of Works, Dato Sri Haji Fadillah bin Haji Yusof. The velodrome can hold 2,000 spectators and was accorded first-class accreditation by Switzerland-based Union Cycliste Internationale (UCI). Outside of the velodrome, there is a BMX cycling track measuring 50m x 120m, which conforms with the UCI's standards and specifications.

== Notable events ==
- 2017 SEA Games - Cycling Track, BMX
- 2017 ASEAN Para Games - Cycling Track
- 2018 Asian Track Cycling Championships
- 2022 Sukma Games - Cycling Track, BMX
- 2023 Asian Track Cycling Championships
- 2024 Sukma Games - Cycling Track
- 2025 Asian Track Cycling Championships
- 2026 UCI Track World Cup
