= 2024 Para Sukma Games =

Multi-sport event in Sarawak, Malaysia

XXI Para Sukma Games
- Host city: Sarawak
- Motto: Semangat Perpaduan Membara (The Spirit of Unity is Burning)
- Teams: 15
- Athletes: 1290
- Events: 327 in 10 sports
- Opening: 22 September
- Closing: 28 September
- Opened by: Governor Wan Junaidi Tuanku Jaafar
- Athlete's Oath: Leeyendy Jisen Abdullah
- Torch lighter: Bonnie Bunyau Gustin
- Main venue: Unity Stadium
- Website: para.sukmasarawak2024.my

The 2024 Para Sukma Games, officially known as the 21st Para Sukma Games were a national multi-sport event held in Sarawak for people with disabilities from 22 to 28 September, 4 weeks after the Sukma Games concluded. This was the third national para sports event to be held under the "Para Sukma" name, following its rebrand from "Paralimpiad Malaysia Games" in 2018.

== Development and preparation ==
=== Venues ===
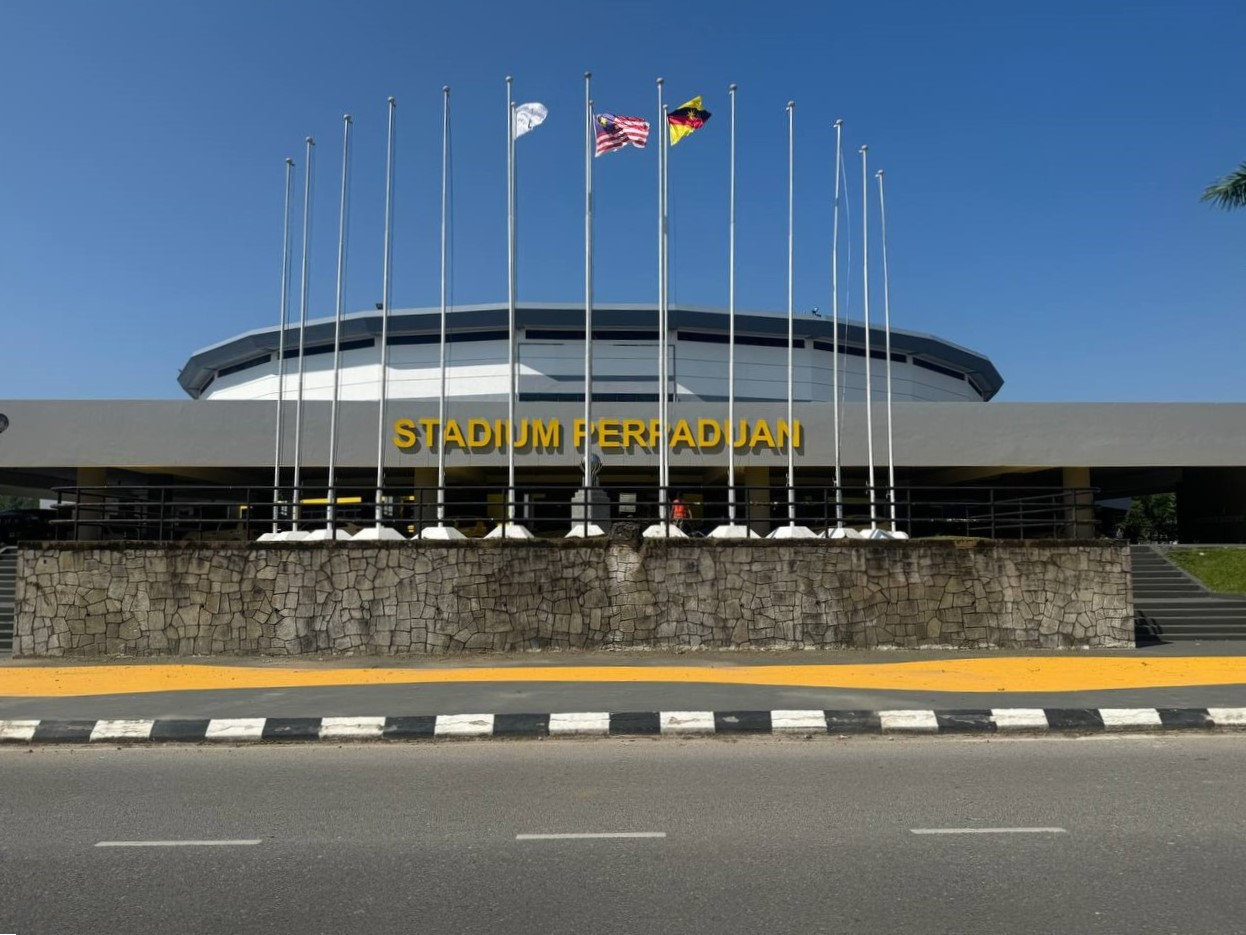
Petra Jaya Unity Stadium (Stadium Perpaduan).

Division	Competition Venue	Sports
Kuching
Kuching	Sarawak Sports Complex	
Kuching	Petra Jaya Unity Stadium	Opening and closing ceremonies
Kuching	Sarawak Stadium	Para athletics
Kuching	Pandelela Rinong Aquatic Centre	Para swimming
Kuching	Petra Jaya Archery Range	Para archery
Kuching	Sarawak Lawn Bowls Arena	Lawn bowls
Kuching	Others	
Kuching	Megalanes, Emart Batu Kawa	Bowling
Kuching	SJK Chung Hua No. 3	Para table tennis
Kuching	Sarawak Badminton Association Hall	Para badminton
Kuching	Sarawak Basketball Association Hall	Boccia
Kuching	Youth and Sports Complex	Para powerlifting
Kuching	Raia Hotel	Chess

=== Athletes' Villages ===
Division	Accommodations
Kuching	Hock Lee Hotel & Residences; Harbour View; 56 Hotel; Merdeka Palace Hotel; Raia Hotel; UCSI Hotel; Serapi Verdure Hotel; Regatta Suites; Citadines Uplands; Grand Continental Hotel.; Riverside Majestic & Astana Wings; Kuching Park Hotel; Roxy Hotel Batu 3; Kingwood; Penview Hotel; Longhouse; Samudera Hotel Kuching; Hua Kuok Inn Oyo; Imperial Hotel

== The Games ==
=== Participating states ===
- Johor (112)
- Kedah (76)
- Kelantan (48)
- Malacca (62)
- Negeri Sembilan (71)
- Pahang (57)
- Penang (81)
- Perak (88)
- Perlis (64)
- Sabah (146)
- Sarawak (host) (213)
- Selangor (100)
- Terengganu (75)
- Kuala Lumpur (33)
- Labuan (64)

=== Sports ===
- Archery (14)
- Athletics (131)
- Badminton (12)
- Boccia (8)
- Bowling (20)
- Chess (24)
- Lawn bowls (19)
- Powerlifting (24)
- Swimming (60)
- Table tennis (15)

=== Calendar ===
OC	Opening ceremony	●	Event competitions	1	Gold medal events	CC	Closing ceremony

September 2024	22nd Sun	23rd Mon	24th Tue	25th Wed	26th Thu	27th Fri	28th Sat	Events
Ceremonies	OC						CC	
Archery		4	●	●	5	5		14
Athletics		36	29	34	24	8		131
Badminton		●	●	●	●	12		12
Boccia		●	●	●	7	1		8
Bowling			8	6	4	2		20
Chess		●	●	12	●	12		24
Lawn bowls	●	3	6	●	●	1	9	19
Powerlifting			6	6	6	6		24
Swimming		15	15	15	15			60
Table tennis		1	4	4	4	2		15
Daily medal events	0	59	68	77	65	49	9	327
Cumulative total	0	59	127	204	269	318	327	327
September 2024	22nd Sun	23rd Mon	24th Tue	25th Wed	26th Thu	27th Fri	28th Sat	Total events

== Medal table ==
- 327 sets of medals offered.
- No bronze medal awarded in
  - Athletics (6)
    - Women's 100m T11/T12
    - Men's 100m T35
    - Men's Shot Put F12
    - Men's Long Jump T38
    - Women's 200m T11/T12
    - Men's Discus Throw F12
  - Boccia (1)
    - Women's Individual BC1
  - Bowling (1)
    - Women's Individual TPB10
  - Swimming (3)
    - Men's 100m Backstroke S13
    - Men's 100m Breaststroke SB13
    - Mixed 4 × 100 m Medley Relay S14
  - Table tennis (2)
    - Women's Standing Singles 6–8
    - Women's Standing Singles 11

* Host nation (Sarawak)

2024 Para Sukma Games medal table
Rank	Team	Gold	Silver	Bronze	Total
1	Sarawak*	82	53	74	209
2	Sabah	62	42	32	136
3	Johor	33	35	29	97
4	Selangor	30	42	40	112
5	Perak	25	22	20	67
6	Kelantan	15	11	17	43
7	Pahang	15	5	9	29
8	Negeri Sembilan	14	19	20	53
9	Terengganu	10	19	15	44
10	Penang	9	15	19	43
11	Kedah	8	24	10	42
12	Kuala Lumpur	8	15	11	34
13	Malacca	7	9	11	27
14	Perlis	6	13	6	25
15	Labuan	3	3	1	7
Totals (15 entries)		327	327	314	968

=== Medals distributed by sport ===
No.	Sport	Gold	Silver	Bronze	Total	Ref
1	Archery	14	14	14	42	
2	Athletics	131	131	125	387	
3	Badminton	12	12	12	36	
4	Boccia	8	8	7	23	
5	Bowling	20	20	19	59	
6	Chess	24	24	24	72	
7	Lawn bowls	19	19	19	57	
8	Powerlifting	24	24	24	72	
9	Swimming	60	60	57	177	
10	Table tennis	15	15	13	43	

=== National and Meet Records ===
No.	Sport	National Record	Meet Record	Ref
1	Archery	2	2	
2	Athletics	0	1	
3	Powerlifting	6	8	
4	Swimming	13	15	

== Broadcasting ==
TVS will broadcast the Games live on TV and YouTube.

== Concerns and controversies ==
=== During the Games ===
==== Para SUKMA Athlete Re-classification Controversy ====
The 2024 Para SUKMA Games faced a structural crisis concerning how athletes were grouped into their respective medical and functional categories. Accusations surfaced that certain para-athletes who had not undergone official classification by accredited classifiers were permitted to compete, particularly within athletics (track and field) events. Renowned Malaysian sports figures, including veteran coach Jeganathan, publicly warned that altering or loosening athlete classifications at a national event like SUKMA undermines the integrity of national para-sports and risks international repercussions if standards are not strictly standardised.

== See also ==
- 2016 Sukma Games
- 2024 Sukma Games

Preceded by MSN	Para Sukma Games; Sarawak; XXI Para Sukma Games (2024)	Succeeded by Selangor
