= 2024 Sukma Games =

Multi-sport event in Sarawak, Malaysia

XXI Sukma Games
- Host city: Sarawak
- Motto: Semangat Perpaduan Membara (The Spirit of Unity is Burning)
- Teams: 15
- Athletes: 9,927
- Events: 488 in 37 sports (44 disciplines)
- Opening: 17 August
- Closing: 24 August
- Opened by: Governor Wan Junaidi Tuanku Jaafar
- Closed by: Prime Minister Anwar Ibrahim
- Athlete's Oath: Enrique Maccartney Harold
- Torch lighter: Pandelela Rinong and Daeloniel Mcdelon Bong
- Main venue: Sarawak Stadium (Opening ceremony); Unity Stadium (Closing ceremony)
- Website: sukmasarawak2024.my

The 2024 Sukma Games (Malay: Sukan Malaysia 2024), officially known as the XXI Sukma Games (Malay: Sukan Malaysia XXI) and also known as Sarawak 2024 was a multi-sport event held in Sarawak. Johor was supposed to host the 20th edition of the Games in July 2020, postponed due to the COVID-19 pandemic, with the 20th edition took over by the National Sports Council (NSC) in September 2022. This was Sarawak's third time to host the Sukma Games, having previously done so in 1990, and 2016.

== Host selection ==
During a meeting of Sukma's highest committee, which was chaired by then-Ministry of Youth and Sports, Khairy Jamaluddin on 15 May 2015, the committee awarded Perak and Johor the right to host 2018 Sukma Games and 2020 Sukma Games respectively, but the latter was postponed to 2022 and held in Kuala Lumpur instead by the National Sports Council due to the COVID-19 pandemic.

In 2023, Sarawak were chosen as the host of Sukan Malaysia (Sukma) 2024 after full agreement by Malaysia Games (Sukma) Supreme Committee to organize the biennial sports event. The committee, which is chaired by the Ministry of Youth and Sports, Hannah Yeoh, said the selection of Sarawak for next year's Sukma was also based on the new rotation system between National Sports Council and the States. (Note: However, any state can offer themselves to take the place of the National Sports Council if it does not involve significant hosting costs and they have adequate facilities, as in the case of next host Selangor when they were chosen the following year during the supreme committee meeting in Kuala Lumpur.)

== Development and preparations ==
=== Venues ===
In 2023, the Premier of Sarawak, Datuk Patinggi Tan Sri Abang Johari Tun Openg, agreed to fully allocate the funds for Sarawak to host Sukan Malaysia 2024. Later in November 2023, the Premier announced an allocation of RM119.35 million for the hosting of the games.

On 18 January 2024, Abdul Karim Rahman Hamzah announced that Sukma 2024 events to be held in nine Sarawak divisions (5 more compared to the last time the state host this event).

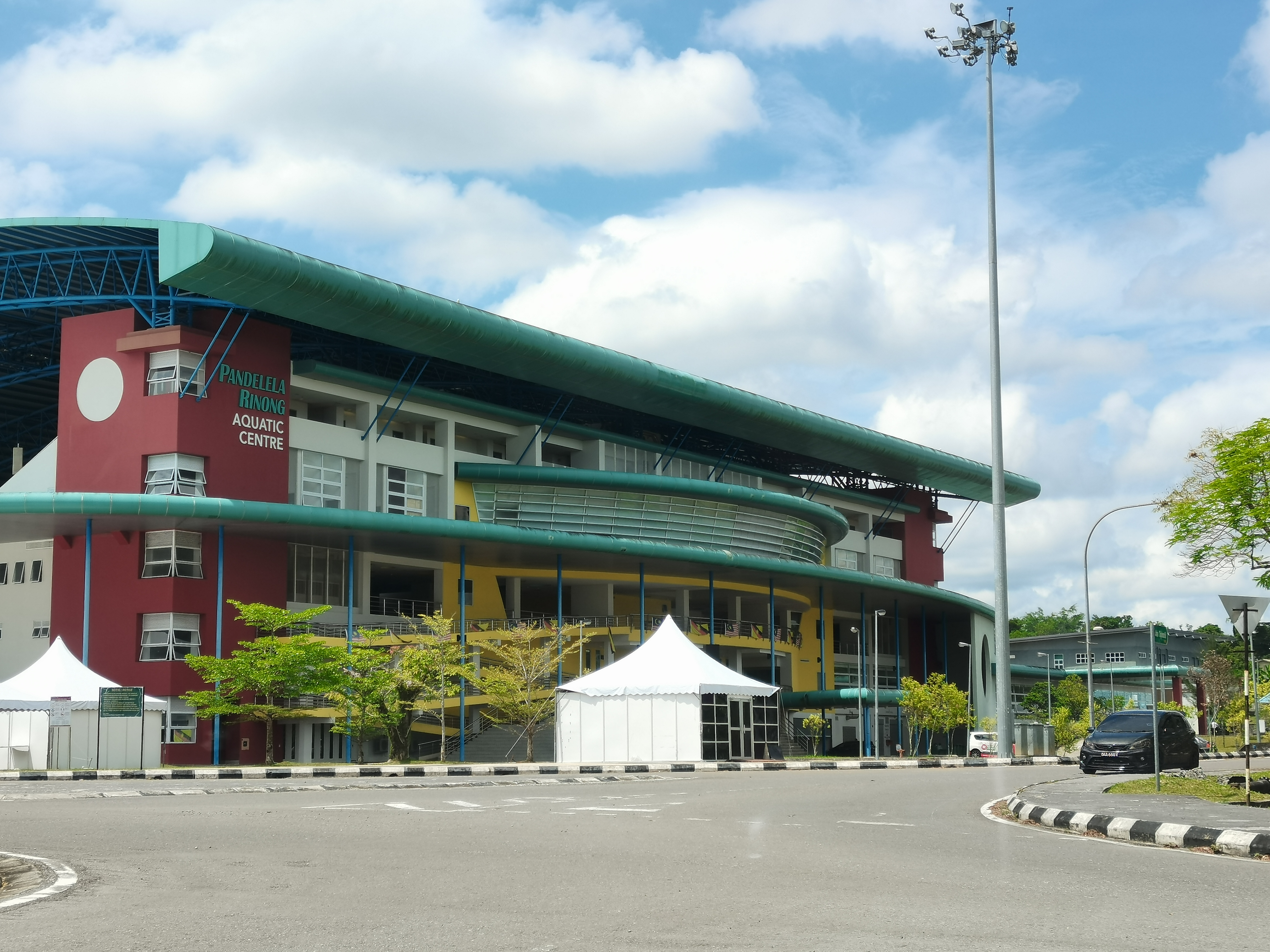
Pandelela Rinong Aquatic Centre.

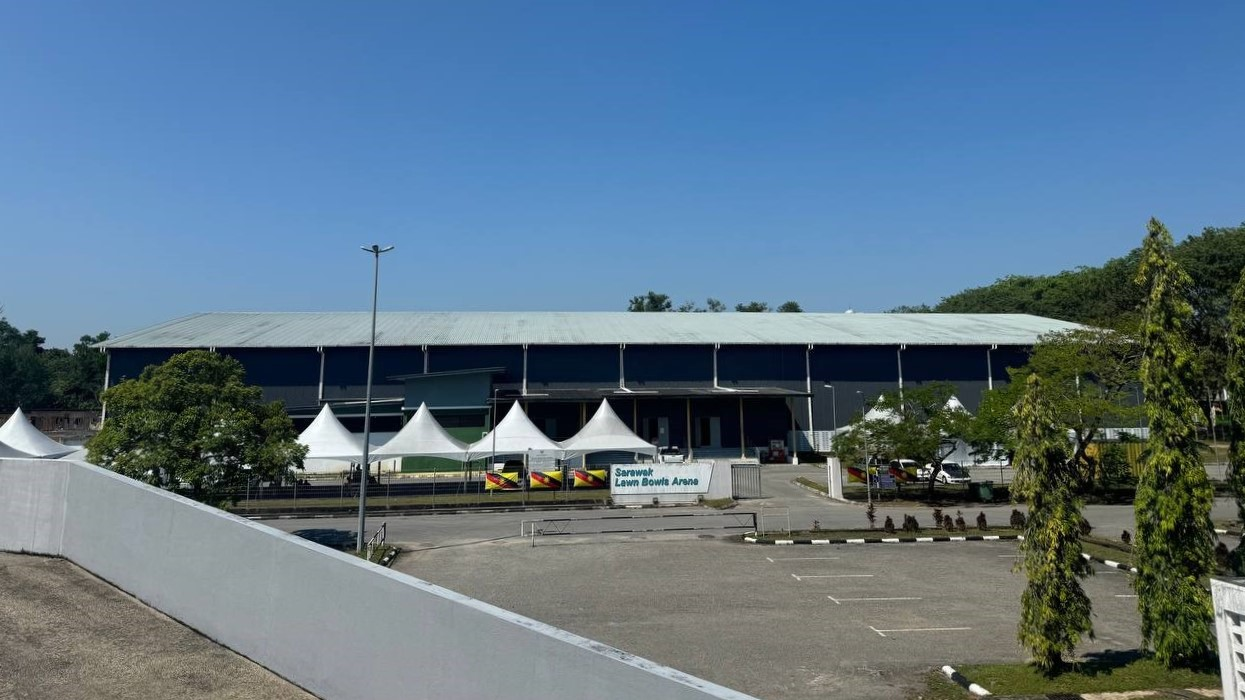
Sarawak Lawn Bowls Arena.

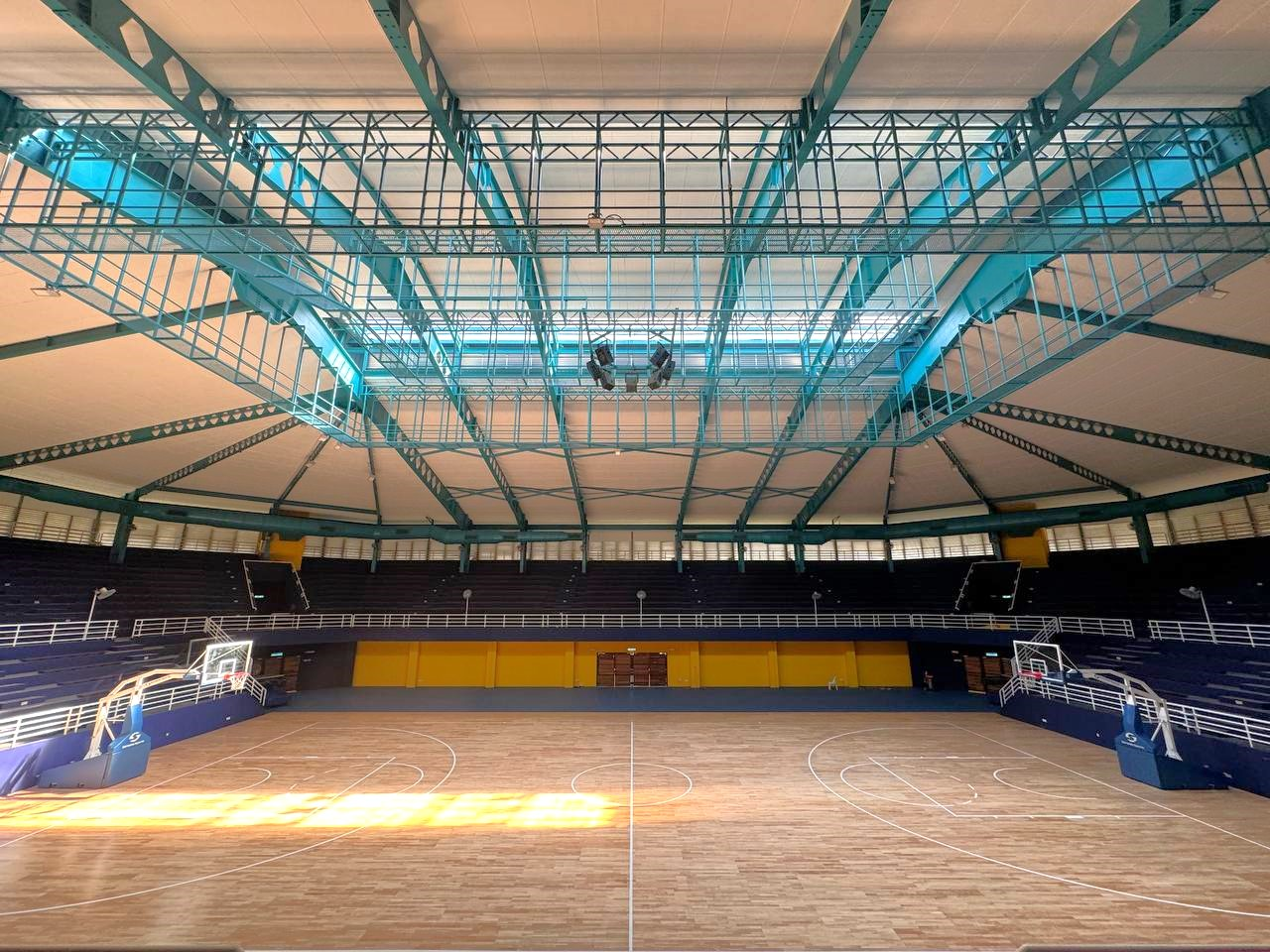
Kuching South City Council (MBKS) Stadium.

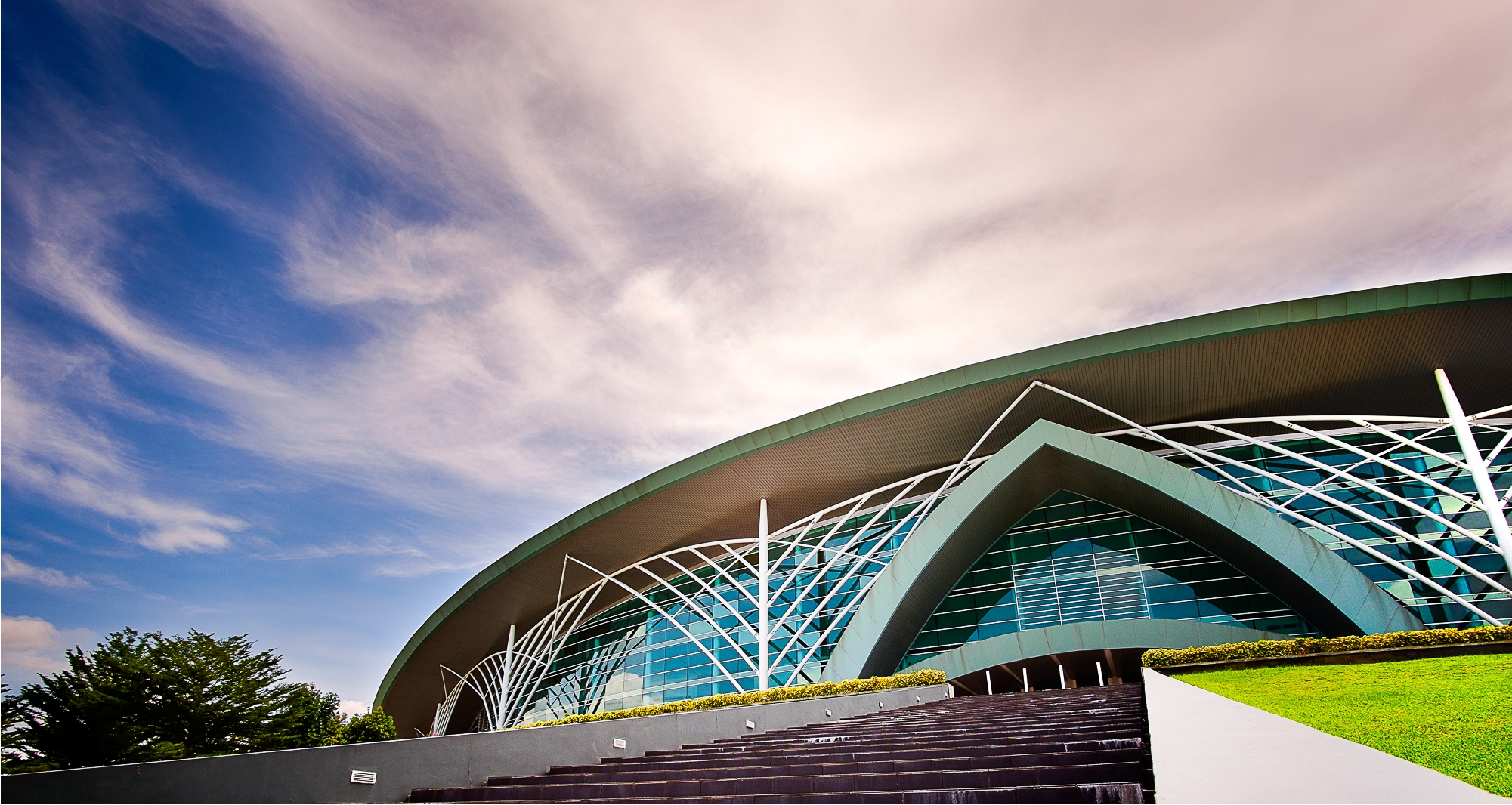
Borneo Convention Centre Kuching (BCCK) which hosts the gymnastics events.

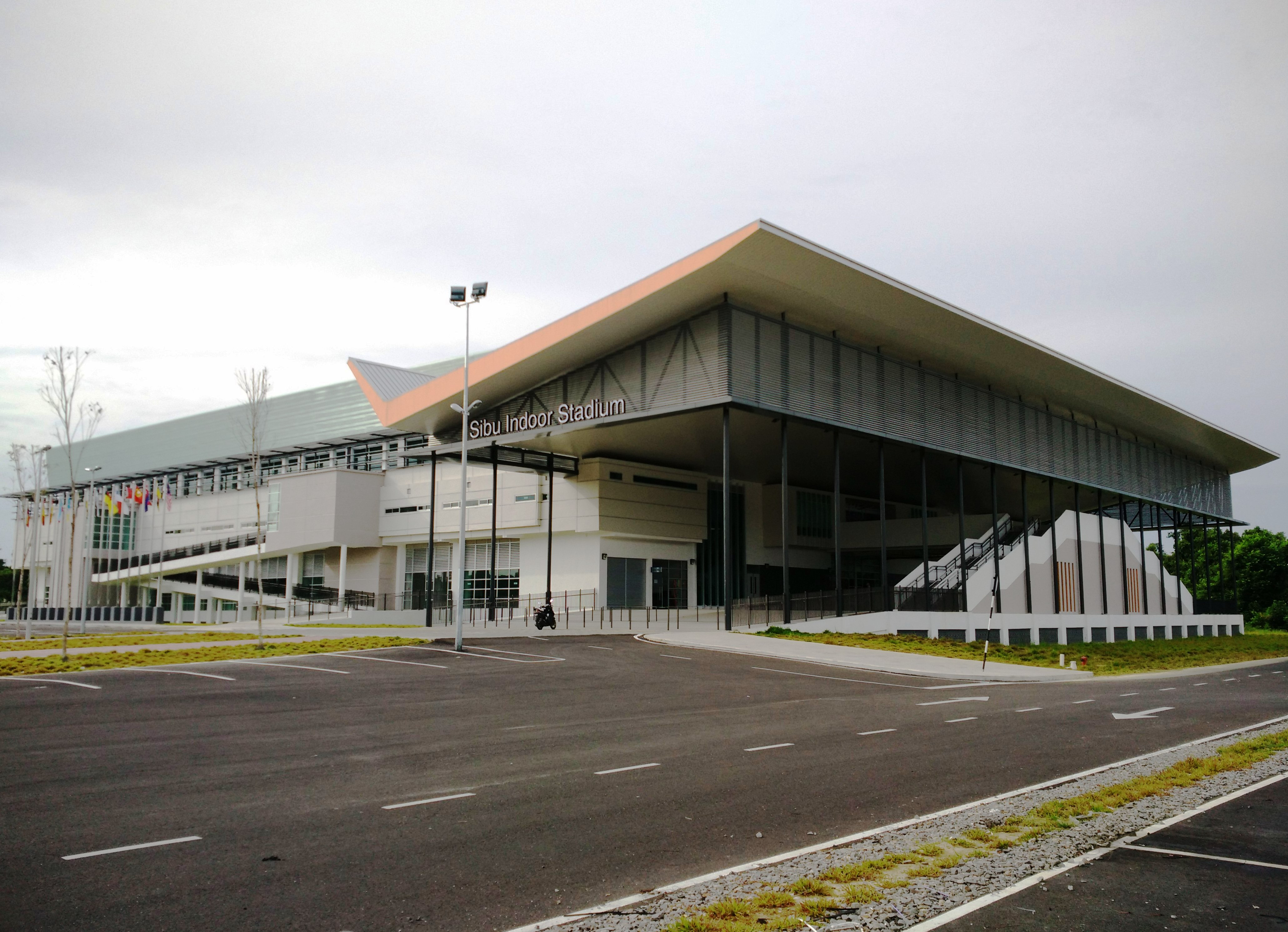
Badminton events were held at the Sibu Indoor Stadium.

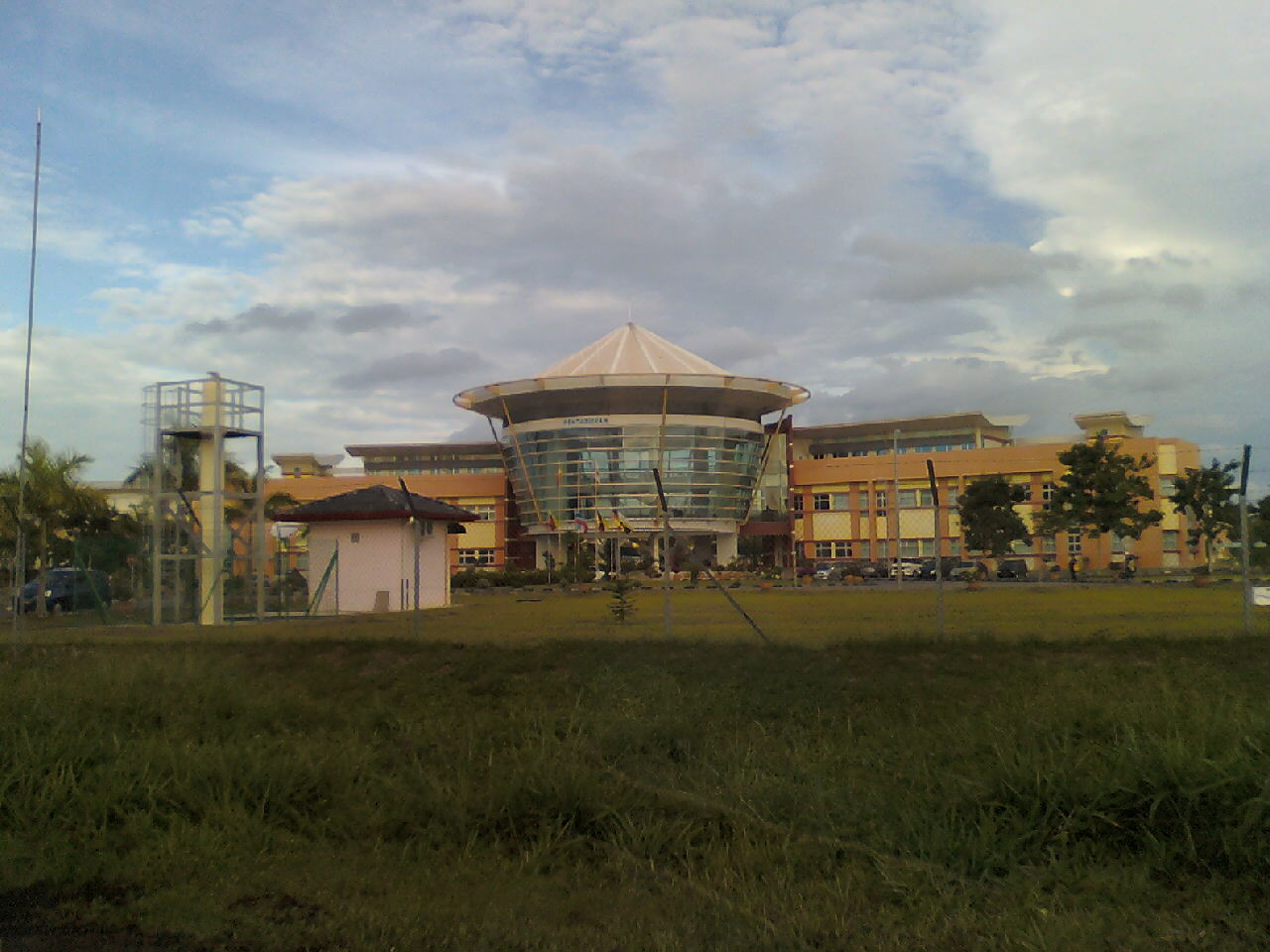
Netball events were held at the Mukah Polytechnic.

Division	Competition Venue	Sports
Kuching
Kuching	Sarawak Sports Complex	
Kuching	Sarawak Stadium	Athletics, Opening ceremony
Kuching	Pandelela Rinong Aquatic Centre	Aquatics (swimming & diving)
Kuching	Sarawak Shooting Range	Shooting
Kuching	Petra Jaya Archery Range	Archery
Kuching	Sarawak Squash Centre	Squash
Kuching	Sarawak Lawn Bowls Arena	Lawn bowls
Kuching	Wushu Centre	Wushu
Kuching	Petra Jaya Hockey Stadium	Field hockey
Kuching	Sarawak State Stadium	Football (women's)
Kuching	Petra Jaya Unity Stadium	Taekwondo, Closing ceremony
Kuching	Cricket and Rugby Ground	Cricket
Kuching	Others	
Kuching	Borneo Convention Centre Kuching	Gymnastics
Kuching	Sarawak Hockey Stadium	Field hockey
Kuching	Bukit Siol, Petra Jaya	Cycling (MTB & BMX)
Kuching	Pehin Sri Adenan Satem Highway (FAC Highway)	Cycling (individual time trial, criterium & road)
Kuching	Sarawak Golf Club	Golf
Kuching	Swinburne University of Technology Sarawak Campus	Esports
Kuching	Sarawak Petanque Centre	Petanque
Kuching	Megalanes, Emart Batu Kawa	Bowling
Kuching	Sarawak Lawn Tennis Association (SLTA)	Tennis
Kuching	Kuching South City Council (MBKS) Stadium	Basketball
Kuching	Hikmah Exchange Event Centre	Silambam
Kuching	SJK Chung Hua No. 3	Table tennis
Kuching	Lundu Community Hall	Kabaddi
Kuching	Union YES Retreat & Training Centre @ Siar	Beach volleyball
Samarahan
Samarahan	Jubli Hall, UiTM Samarahan	Chess
Samarahan	Kota Samarahan Indoor Stadium	Futsal
Serian
Serian	Serian Conference Centre	Gymanstics (artistic)
Sri Aman
Sri Aman	Simanggang Indoor Stadium	Boxing
Betong
Betong	Panglima Rentap Hall	Weightlifting
Sibu
Sibu	Sibu Indoor Stadium	Badminton
Sibu	Sibu Volleyball Indoor Stadium	Volleyball
Sibu	Stadium Tun Zaidi	Football (men's)
Sibu	Azman Hashim Community Sports Centre	Football (men's)
Mukah
Mukah	Mukah Stadium	Football (men's)
Mukah	Dalat and Mukah District Council (MDDM) Field	Football (men's)
Mukah	Sri Balau Hall, UiTM Mukah	Judo
Mukah	Mukah Polytechnic	Netball
Bintulu
Bintulu	Bintulu Stadium	Football (men's)
Bintulu	Naim Bintulu Paragon	Muay thai
Bintulu	Muhibbah Stadium	Sepak takraw
Miri
Miri	Marina Bay	Sailing
Miri	Miri Stadium	Rugby
Miri	National Youth Skills Institute (IKBN)	Karate & softball (men's)
Miri	Eastwood Valley and Country Club	Fencing
Miri	Merbau National Primary School	Softball (women's)
Miri	Miri Indoor Stadium	Pencak silat

=== Athletes' villages ===
Division	Accommodations
Kuching	Aminuddin Baki Institute Kuching; Citadines Uplands Kuching; Construction Industry Development Board Kuching; Dormani Hotel Kuching; Imperial Hotel Kuching; Youth and Sports Complex Kuching; Kingwood Hotel Kuching; Kuching Park Hotel; Merdeka Palace Kuching; Penview Hotel Kuching; Roxy Hotel Kuching; SALCRA Bajo Training Centre, Lundu; Sarawak Centre of Technical Excellence (Centex), Kuching; Sarawak Centre of Technical Excellence (Centex), Lundu; Swinburne University of Technology Sarawak Campus; UCSI Hotel Kuching; Union YES Retreat Lundu
Samarahan	INTAN Sarawak Regional Campus, Kota Samarahan; Universiti Malaysia Sarawak, Kota Samarahan; Universiti Teknologi MARA Samarahan Campus, Kota Samarahan
Serian	Roxy Hotel Serian
Sri Aman	BME Hotel Sri Aman; Roxy Hotel Sri Aman; Seri Simanggang Hotel
Betong	MARA Junior Science College Betong; Medan Hotel Betong
Sibu	Desa Sanyan, Kolej Laila Taib, Sibu; Kingwood Hotel Sibu
Mukah	Kingwood Hotel, Mukah; Universiti Teknologi MARA Mukah Campus, Mukah
Bintulu	Fairfield by Marriott Bintulu Paragon; Parkcity Everly Hotel, Bintulu; Universiti Putra Malaysia Bintulu Campus, Bintulu
Miri	Eastwood Valley Golf & Country Club Miri; Institute of Teacher Education Miri; Mega Hotel Miri; National Youth Skills Institute (IKBN), Miri

=== Baton relay ===
A relay of baton (which resembles a torch) was held statewide, beginning in Lawas on 27 April 2024 and conclude in Kuching on 23 June 2024.

2024 SUKMA Games baton relay stops

No.	City, Division	Date	Ref
1	Lawas, Limbang	27 April	
2	Miri, Miri	28 April	
3	Bintulu, Bintulu	11 May	
4	Mukah, Mukah	12 May	
5	Sibu, Sibu	18 May	
6	Kapit, Kapit	19 May	
7	Sarikei, Sarikei	8 June	
8	Betong, Betong	9 June	
9	Simanggang, Sri Aman	15 June	
10	Serian, Serian	16 June	
11	Kota Samarahan, Samarahan	22 June	
12	Kuching, Kuching	23 June	

== Marketing ==
The official logo, mascots and song are chosen through a competition organised by the Ministry of Youth, Sports And Entrepreneur Development Sarawak and was unveiled during the launching ceremony at Pullman Hotel, Kuching on 9 March 2024.

=== Logo ===
The official logo of the 2024 Sukma Games, resembling a "burning torch", is designed by Azrilalfatt Hassim. A slightly different version was used for the Para Sukma Games.

=== Mascot ===
Satria (2024 version)

Satrina (2024 version)

A revised version of the pair of Rhinoceros hornbill named "Satria" and "Satrina", with a fiercer and more realistic look than the 2016 version, was adopted as the official mascot of the 2024 Sukma Games. The mascots were designed by a freelance designer, Ikhbar Ruzaini Abang@Ebai who incorporates complex colouring, while staying true to the colours of the Sarawak flag — red, yellow, and black. The designer crafted a total of 47 different icons for the mascots, depicting them in various sports actions, with 37 icons representing different sports and 10 icons dedicated to Para Sukma events.

=== Medal design ===
The 2024 SUKMA Games medals featured a prominent central torch symbolising the Games itself, set against traditional Iban ethnic motifs background to honour Sarawak as the host state on the obverse side. The date of the event as well as the Games logo and motto are also carved on the periphery of the medal. The reverse side featured the image of the mascots and the Games logo and the name of the event the winning athlete receive the medal.

=== Official song ===
The official song of the games is entitled "Sukma Sarawak, Kesukanan dan Perpaduan" (lit. 'Sukma Sarawak, Sportsmanship and Unity') and is composed by Kaderi Awang Lihi. Another version of this song is also composed for Para Sukma Games.

=== Official mobile app ===
On 9 August 2024, Abdul Karim Rahman Hamzah launched the official Sukma Sarawak 2024 mobile app, a first for Sukma games. The app contains detailed information about the Games, including event schedules, athlete profiles, results and the medal tally. A separate app was also created for Para Sukma Games as well.

=== Corporate sponsorship ===
Sponsors of the 2024 SUKMA and Para SUKMA Games
Partners
- Malaysia Airlines (airline partner)
- Grab (e-hailing partner)
- Keris Sakti (merchandise partner)
- Rapid Bus (transport partner)
- TVS (official broadcaster)
- Radio Televisyen Malaysia (official broadcaster)
Platinum sponsors
- CelcomDigi
- U Mobile
- MOMA
- Milo
Gold sponsors
- Sarawak Energy
- Petroleum Sarawak
- Petronas
- Sarawak Information Systems
- Ta Ann Holdings
- F&N Beverages Marketing
- Cahya Mata Sarawak
Silver sponsors
- Affin Group
- Bintulu Development Authority
- Sarawak Timber Industry Development Corporation & Subsidiaries
- Bintulu Port Holdings
- WTK Holdings
- MyUS Autotech
- Maxis Broadband
- Petra Energy
- Press Metal Bintulu
Bronze sponsors
- KTS Group of Companies
- Hock Seng Lee
- Lee Fah Mee Trading
- Shell Malaysia
- Ibraco
- Brooke Holding
- Sarawak Incorporated
- Borneo Development Corporation (Sarawak)

== The Games ==
=== Opening ceremony ===
The opening ceremony was held at Sarawak Stadium on 17 August 2024. 15,000 admission tickets were distributed to the public for free by the Sarawak Implementation Monitoring Unit. The opening ceremony reflects a holistic sense of unity, under the concept of Matlamat Perpaduan Membara (lit. The Goal of Unity is Burning). A total of 1,800 participants, including members of various associations, students from public and private higher education institutions, and school students took part in the event, aside of performences from local Sarawakian stars like Hafiz Suip, Alena Murang, Bob Yusof, Roxy Ixzy, and Ramles Walter. It was broadcast live by Radio Televisyen Malaysia, TVS and the Sarawak Public Communications Unit (UKAS).

=== Closing ceremony ===
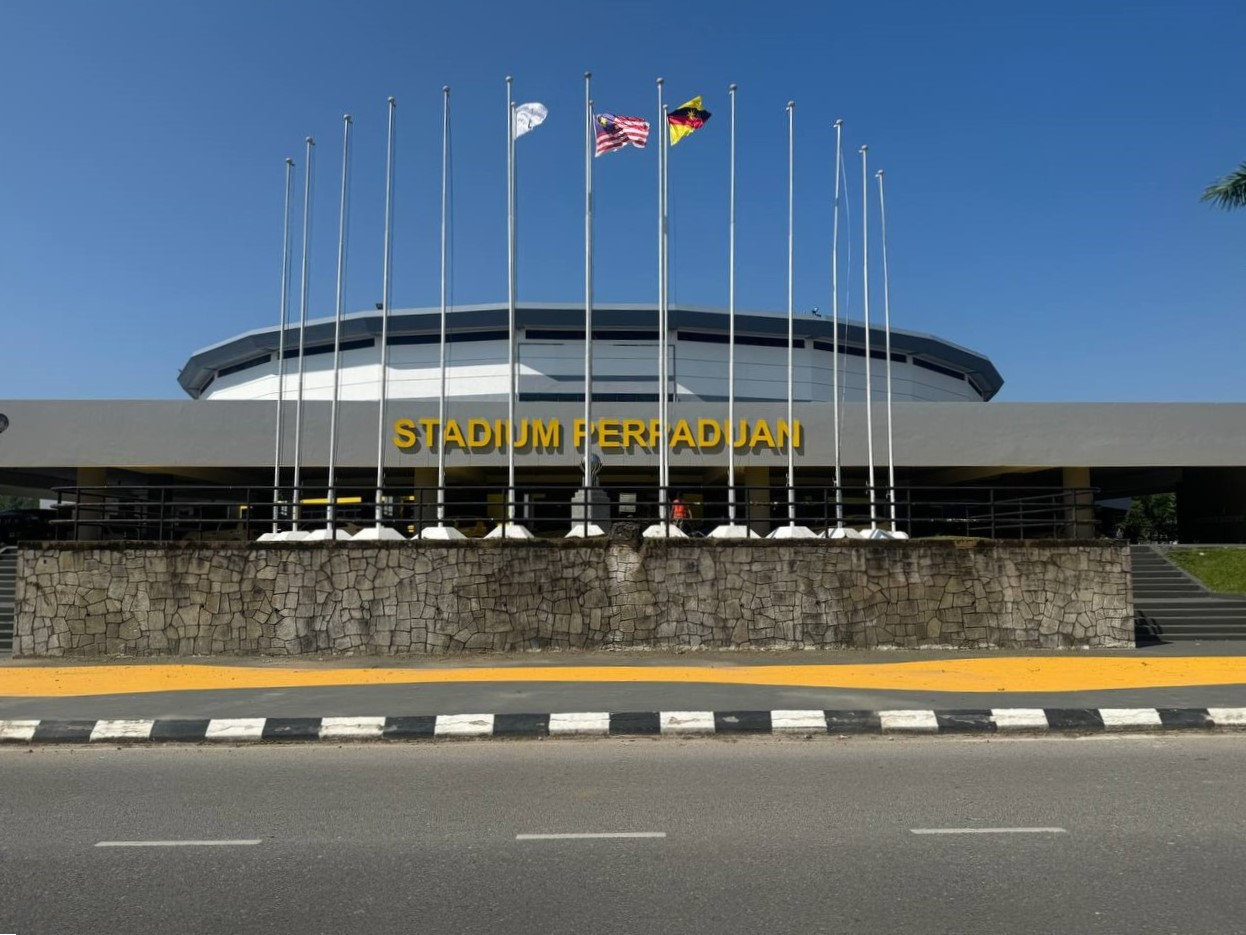
Unity Stadium (Stadium Perpaduan).

The closing ceremony was held at Unity Stadium (Stadium Perpaduan) on 24 August 2024.

=== Participating states ===
Participating State Sports Councils
- Johor (599)
- Kedah (384)
- Kelantan (472)
- Malacca (461)
- Negeri Sembilan (500)
- Pahang (603)
- Penang (606)
- Perak (770)
- Perlis (284)
- Sabah (713)
- Sarawak (host) (1173)
- Selangor (704)
- Terengganu (908)
- Federal Territories (711)
- Brunei (61)

==== Number of athletes by State Sports Council ====
Ranking	State	Athletes
1	Sarawak	1173
2	Terengganu	908
3	Perak	770
4	Sabah	713
5	Federal Territories	711
6	Selangor	704
7	Penang	606
8	Pahang	603
9	Johor	599
10	Negeri Sembilan	500
11	Kelantan	472
12	Malacca	461
13	Kedah	384
14	Perlis	284
15	Brunei	61

=== Sports ===
37 sports (with 44 disciplines) will be contested in these games.

- Aquatics
  - Diving (12)
  - Swimming (41)
- Archery (14)
- Athletics (47)
- Badminton (6)
- Basketball
  - Basketball (2)
  - 3×3 basketball (2)
- Bowling (11)
- Boxing (15)
- Chess (10)
- Cricket (3)
- Cycling
  - BMX racing (2)
  - Mountain biking (5)
  - Road (8)
- Esports (7)
- Fencing (12)
- Field hockey (2)
- Football
  - Football (2)
  - Futsal (1)
- Golf (4)
- Gymnastics
  - Artistic (14)
  - Rhythmic (7)
- Judo (18)
- Kabaddi (2)
- Karate (17)
- Lawn bowls (9)
- Muay Thai (18)
- Netball (1)
- Pencak silat (28)
- Petanque (13)
- Rugby sevens (2)
- Sailing (14)
- Sepak takraw (8)
- Shooting (24)
- Silambam (14)
- Softball (2)
- Squash (6)
- Table tennis (6)
- Taekwondo (25)
- Tennis (6)
- Volleyball
  - Volleyball (2)
  - Beach volleyball (2)
- Weightlifting (16)
- Wushu (28)

=== Calendar ===
- May differ from tentative schedule
- Subject to weather conditions and decision by technical officers.

OC	Opening ceremony	●	Event competitions	1	Gold medal events	CC	Closing ceremony

August 2024		12th Mon	13th Tue	14th Wed	15th Thu	16th Fri	17th Sat	18th Sun	19th Mon	20th Tue	21st Wed	22nd Thu	23rd Fri	24th Sat	Events
Ceremonies							OC							CC	
Aquatics	Diving								2	3	3	2	2		12
Aquatics	Swimming								8	9	8	8	8		41
Archery								4	●	●	2	4	4		14
Athletics									9	13	8	10	7		47
Badminton							●	●	●	1	●	●	●	5	6
Basketball	Basketball				●	●	●	●	●	●	2				2
Basketball	3×3 basketball											●	2		2
Bowling					2	2	1	2	2	2					11
Boxing						●	●	●	●	●	●	8	7		15
Chess										●	2	●	2	6	10
Cricket			●	●	●	●	●	●	1	●	●	●	●	2	3
Cycling	Road cycling			2	2	2	2								8
Cycling	BMX							●	2						2
Cycling	Mountain biking										2	3			5
Esports										1	1	1	1	3	7
Fencing									2	2	2	3	3		12
Field hockey						●	●	●	●	●	●	●	●	2	2
Football	Football	●		●		●		●	●	●	●	●	1	1	2
Football	Futsal		●	●	●	●	●		●		●		1		1
Golf						●	●	4							4
Gymnastics	Artistic										2	2	5	5	14
Gymnastics	Rhythmic						1	1	5						7
Judo										4	7	7			18
Kabaddi										●	●	1	1		2
Karate							7	8	2						17
Lawn bowls			●	●	●	4	●	●	1	●	●	●	4		9
Muay Thai					●	●	●	●	4	14					18
Netball							●	●	●	●	●	●	1		1
Pencak silat								●	●	8	●	●	20		28
Petanque							●	2	2	3	●	4	●	2	13
Rugby sevens									●	●	●	2			2
Sailing									●	●	●	●	●	14	14
Sepak takraw				●	●	1	1	●	●	4	●	●	2		8
Shooting							6	6	4	6	2				24
Silambam										4	●	10			14
Softball					●	●	●	●	2						2
Squash						●	●	2	1	2	●	●	1		6
Table tennis									●	●	●	2	2	2	6
Taekwondo						5	6	6	6	2					25
Tennis						●	●	●	1	●	●	5			6
Volleyball	Beach volleyball						●	●	●	●	●	●	2		2
Volleyball	Volleyball						●	●	●	●	●	●	2		2
Weightlifting									3	3	3	3	4		16
Wushu				6	8	14									28
Daily medal events		0	0	8	12	28	24	35	57	81	44	75	82	42	488
Cumulative total		0	0	8	20	48	72	107	164	245	289	364	446	488	488
August 2024		12th Mon	13th Tue	14th Thu	15th Fri	16th Sat	17th Sun	18th Mon	19th Tue	20th Wed	21st Thu	22nd Fri	23rd Sat	24th Sun	Total events

== Medal table ==
- 488 sets of medals offered.
- Two bronze medals awarded in Boxing (14), Judo (18), Karate (17), Muay Thai (14), Pencak Silat (28), Silambam (8), Taekwondo (24) and Wushu (8).
- Gold-medal tie in Artistic Gymnastics Men's Rings event (no silver medal awarded).
- Bronze-medal ties in Artistic Gymnastics Men's Horizontal Bars and Men's Vault and Silambam Mix Synchronised Bare Hand events.

* Host nation (Sarawak)

2024 Sukma Games medal table
Rank	Team	Gold	Silver	Bronze	Total
1	Sarawak*	76	55	70	201
2	Federal Territories	75	65	72	212
3	Selangor	56	64	61	181
4	Penang	41	45	52	138
5	Terengganu	41	36	47	124
6	Johor	35	42	58	135
7	Perak	35	38	57	130
8	Sabah	29	36	55	120
9	Pahang	23	21	32	76
10	Kedah	21	19	28	68
11	Negeri Sembilan	19	13	24	56
12	Malacca	17	23	30	70
13	Perlis	12	15	16	43
14	Kelantan	7	13	17	37
15	Brunei	2	2	3	7
Totals (15 entries)		489	487	622	1,598

=== Medals distributed by sport ===
No.	Sport		Gold	Silver	Bronze	Total	Ref
1	Aquatics	Diving	12	12	12	36	
1	Aquatics	Swimming	41	41	41	123	
2	Archery		14	14	14	42	
3	Athletics		47	47	47	141	
4	Badminton		6	6	6	18	
5	Basketball	Basketball	2	2	2	6	
5	Basketball	3x3 basketball	2	2	2	6	
6	Bowling		11	11	11	33	
7	Boxing		15	15	29	59	
8	Chess		10	10	10	30	
9	Cricket		3	3	3	9	
10	Cycling	BMX racing	2	2	2	6	
10	Cycling	Mountain biking	5	5	5	15	
10	Cycling	Road	8	8	8	24	
11	Esports		7	7	7	21	
12	Fencing		12	12	12	36	
13	Field hockey		2	2	2	6	
14	Football	Football	2	2	2	6	
14	Football	Futsal	1	1	1	3	
15	Golf		4	4	4	12	
16	Gymnastics	Artistic	15	13	14	42	
16	Gymnastics	Rhythmic	7	7	7	21	
17	Judo		18	18	36	72	
18	Kabaddi		2	2	2	6	
19	Karate		17	17	34	68	
20	Lawn bowls		9	9	9	27	
21	Muay Thai		18	18	32	68	
22	Netball		1	1	1	3	
23	Pencak silat		28	28	56	112	
24	Petanque		13	13	13	39	
25	Rugby sevens		2	2	2	6	
26	Sailing		14	14	14	42	
27	Sepak takraw		8	8	8	24	
28	Shooting		24	24	24	72	
29	Silambam		14	14	23	51	
30	Softball		2	2	2	6	
31	Squash		6	6	6	18	
32	Table tennis		6	6	6	18	
33	Taekwondo		25	25	49	99	
34	Tennis		6	6	6	18	
35	Volleyball	Volleyball	2	2	2	6	
35	Volleyball	Beach volleyball	2	2	2	6	
36	Weightlifting		16	16	16	48	
37	Wushu		28	28	36	92	

=== National and Meet Records ===
No.	Sport		National Record	Meet Record	Ref
1	Aquatics	Swimming	3	20	
2	Archery		2	2	
3	Athletics		1	8	
4	Shooting		0	5	
5	Weightlifting		3	0	

== Broadcasting ==
20 of the 37 sports contested at the Games will be broadcast live by two official broadcasters - Radio Televisyen Malaysia, TVS, and one non-official broadcaster - Astro Arena.

== Concerns and controversies ==
=== Before the Games ===
==== Political Disputes Over Hosting Rights ====
Before the games even kicked off, 2024 SUKMA Games was heavily entangled in political friction regarding who was originally supposed to host the event. Accusations surfaced from Malaysian Islamic Party (PAS) Youth leadership claiming that the federal Ministry of Youth and Sports had unfairly denied Kelantan its rightful turn to host the 2024 games. The dispute required federal clarification and state executive council statements to confirm that Kelantan had willingly deferred its hosting duties to 2028 to allow more time for building state-of-the-art sports infrastructure.

=== During the Games ===
==== Football Match Brawls ====
On-field tensions boiled over into physical violence during a men's football group stage match on 14 August 2024 at Mukah Stadium. A highly competitive Group D match between host state Sarawak and the Federal Territories ended in a 1-1 draw. Disagreements with referee calls during the match led to an aggressive on-pitch brawl between players, including Sarawakian Goalkeeper Faridzuan Pekan. Players from both contingents clashed physically before coaching staff and security personnel could separate them, casting a shadow over the tournament's sportsmanship.

The gold-medal match between Federal Territories and Malacca at the same stadium on 24 August 2024 was described as a highly aggressive and "ill-tempered" clash. Tempers flared continuously throughout the match, resulting in multiple rough tackles, scuffles, and a red card for Team Malacca forward Haziq Zamri in the 72nd minute. Frustrated by several match decisions, Malacca players aggressively swarmed and made a beeline for the referee as soon as the final whistle blew. Police and stadium security personnel had to physically intervene and escort the referee safely off the pitch. Federal Territories won the match 2-1 to claim the gold medal. This incident drew condemnation from Football Association of Malaysia local competitions organising committee chairman Firdaus Mohamed.

==== Pencak silat officiating disputes ====
During the Pencak Silat 45kg Putri Class quarterfinal match between Sarawak's Iman Syakilla Mahdi and the Federal Territories' Nurin Alyaa Damia Masran on 21 August 2024, the match outcome sparked fierce debate. The incident is believed to have stemmed from disatisfaction with the scoring system, which allegedly malfunctioned during the match. It concluded with the Federal Territories athlete being declared the winner following a mutual agreement between the team coaches. However, the Rumpun Silat Sarawak Supreme Council strongly opposed and challenged the decision, leading to widespread calls for stricter transparency in martial arts scoring systems.

While the Pencak Silat dispute began over scoring, it quickly degraded into a major security threat. Frustrated spectators began hurling plastic water bottles and objects directly onto the competition arena. The matches had to be abruptly suspended across multiple rings to protect the athletes and officials. The Royal Malaysia Police opened a formal criminal investigation under Section 506 of the Penal Code for criminal intimidation.

To maintain safety, organisers completely banned spectators from entering the stadium for the remaining days of the Silat tournament, forcing the national event to finish behind closed doors.

== See also ==
- 2016 Sukma Games
- 2024 Para Sukma Games

== Notes ==
Preceded by MSN	Sukma Games; Sarawak; XXI Sukma Games (2024)	Succeeded by Selangor
