= 2026 Para Sukma Games =

Multi-sport event in Selangor, Malaysia

XXII Para Sukma Games
- Host city: Selangor
- Motto: Rentak Kita, Aksi Kita (Our Rhythm, Our Action)
- Teams: 14
- Athletes: 1,736
- Events: 325 in 10 sports
- Opening: 5 September
- Closing: 10 September
- Main venue: His Highness Chancellor Grand Hall, Universiti Teknologi MARA
- Website: selangor2026.com

The 2026 Para Sukma Games (Malay: Sukan Para Malaysia 2026), officially known as the XXII Para Sukma Games (Malay: Sukan Para Malaysia XXII) and also known as Selangor 2026 was a national multi-sport event that took place in the state of Selangor from 5 to 10 September 2026. This was Selangor's second time to host the Para Sukma Games, including the Malaysian Paralympiad in 1998. For the first time, the Federal territories of Malaysia participated in the Games as a single unified delegation, having previously participated as two individual territories in past iterations.

== Development and preparation ==
=== Venues ===
City	Competition Venue	Sports
Petaling District Cluster
Shah Alam
Shah Alam	His Highness Chancellor Grand Hall, Universiti Teknologi MARA Main Campus	Closing ceremony
Shah Alam	UiTM Stadium	Para athletics
Shah Alam	Selangor Aquatic Centre	Para swimming
Shah Alam	Youth and Sports Complex	Para archery, Para badminton
Shah Alam	Selangor International Trade Centre	Para powerlifting
Shah Alam	MBSA Section 19 Tanjung Grand Hall	Boccia
Subang Jaya	Sunway Megalanes, Sunway Pyramid	Para bowling
Klang District Cluster
Klang
Klang	Wyndham Acmar Klang	Para Chess
Klang	MBDK Hall, Bukit Raja	Para table tennis
Klang	Bayuemas Lawn Bowls Complex	Lawn bowls

== The games ==
=== Participating teams ===
Participating State Sports Councils
- Johor (117)
- Kedah (71)
- Kelantan (76)
- Malacca (87)
- Negeri Sembilan (98)
- Pahang (126)
- Penang (96)
- Perak (129)
- Perlis (87)
- Sabah (205)
- Sarawak (210)
- Selangor (host) (211)
- Terengganu (80)
- Federal Territories (143)

==== Number of athletes by State Sports Council ====
Ranking	State	Athletes
1	Selangor	211
2	Sarawak	210
3	Sabah	205
4	Federal Territories	143
5	Perak	129
6	Pahang	126
7	Johor	117
8	Negeri Sembilan	98
9	Penang	96
10	Malacca	87
10	Perlis	87
12	Terengganu	80
13	Kelantan	76
14	Kedah	71

=== Sports ===
- Boccia (7)
- Bowling (19)
- Chess (24)
- Lawn bowls (19)
- Para archery (14)
- Para athletics (126)
- Para badminton (12)
- Para powerlifting (12)
- Para swimming (77)
- Para table tennis (15)

=== Calendar ===
- Combined Sukma and Para Sukma Opening Ceremonies were held on 15 August.
- Due to the 2026 Southeast Asian haze that resulted in Air Quality Index (AQI) reading of 169 in the state, certain sports such as Archery, Athletics, Lawn bowls and Swimming were postponed and rescheduled from their original date of 6 September. Further excacerbation of the weather condition also saw several archery knockout events postponed from their original 8 September schedule.

●	Event competitions	1	Gold medal events	CC	Closing ceremony

September	5th Sat	6th Sun	7th Mon	8th Tue	9th Wed	10th Thu	Medals
Ceremonies						CC	
Boccia		●	●	1	3	3	7
Bowling			8	5	4	2	19
Chess		●	●	12	●	12	24
Lawn bowls	●	●	2	6	6	5	19
Para archery		2	2		2	8	14
Para athletics		18	38	41	29		126
Para badminton		●	●	●	●	12	12
Para powerlifting		3	3	3	3		12
Para swimming			22	22	22	11	77
Para table tennis		3	●	7	●	5	15
Daily medal events	0	26	75	97	69	58	325
Cumulative total	0	26	101	198	267	325	325
September	5th Sat	6th Sun	7th Mon	8th Tue	9th Wed	10th Thu	Events

== Medal table ==
- Correction:
  - Badminton event Women's Singles SL4+SU5 medal tally correction:
    - Johor medal standings: 1 gold, 1 silver and 2 bronzes
    - Federal Territories medal standings: 1 silver and 1 bronze
    - Gold: Sarawak - Nursyazwani Shahrom
    - Silver: Federal Territories - Nor Fariha Kamarudin
    - Bronze: Johor - Siti Shafiroh Ismail
    - Fourth place: Federal Territories - Lau Zhi Qi
- 325 medal sets on offer
- Bronze medal tie in:
  - Bowling (1)
    - Men's Singles TPB4
- For events with few participants:
- No silver and bronze medals awarded in:
  - Athletics (2)
    - Women's 100m T37
    - Women's 200m T37
  - Swimming (2)
    - Men's 50m Backstroke S4
    - Men's 100m Backstroke S11
- No bronze medal awarded in:
  - Athletics (5)
    - Men's 400m T12
    - Men's 400m T44
    - Men's 100m T35
    - Women's 100m T36
    - Women's 200m T36
  - Lawn bowls (1)
    - Open Pair B2
  - Bowling (1)
    - Doubles TPB2+TPB2
  - Swimming (3)
    - Men's 50m Freestyle S11
    - Men's 100m Breaststroke SB11
    - Men's 100m Freestyle S11

* Host nation ( Selangor)

Rank	Team	Gold	Silver	Bronze	Total
1	Selangor*	93	55	52	200
2	Sabah	69	51	45	165
3	Sarawak	52	32	54	138
4	Johor	26	31	32	89
5	Perak	16	25	23	64
6	Federal Territories	13	26	9	48
7	Negeri Sembilan	12	14	19	45
8	Perlis	10	8	9	27
9	Penang	7	16	14	37
10	Terengganu	7	11	19	37
11	Pahang	7	11	13	31
12	Kelantan	5	19	12	36
13	Malacca	4	12	2	18
14	Kedah	4	10	9	23
Totals (14 entries)		325	321	312	958

=== Medals distributed by sport ===
No.	Sport	Gold	Silver	Bronze	Total	Ref
1	Boccia	7	7	7	21	
2	Bowling	19	19	19	57	
3	Chess	24	24	24	72	
4	Lawn bowls	19	19	18	56	
5	Para archery	14	14	14	42	
6	Para athletics	126	124	119	369	
7	Para badminton	12	12	12	36	
8	Para powerlifting	12	12	12	36	
9	Para swimming	77	75	72	224	
10	Para table tennis	15	15	15	45	

=== National, Games and Meet Records ===
No.	Sport	National Record (NR)	Meet Record (MR)	Ref
1	Para Archery	4	1	
2	Para athletics	0	44	
3	Para powerlifting	4	6	
4	Para swimming	36	39	

== Concerns and controversies ==
On 15 August 2026, a localised controversy erupted on social media early on when a viral video exposed an incident where the host state Para Sukma swimmers were abruptly forced to halt their official training sessions.The sudden interruption sparked backlash regarding scheduling fairness and respect for para-athletes. The situation grew significant enough that Selangor Menteri Besar Datuk Seri Amirudin Shari had to publicly issue a guarantee that the pool schedule coordination errors would be resolved and would not happen again.

== See also ==
- 2026 Sukma Games

Preceded by Sarawak	Para Sukma Games; Selangor; XXII Para Sukma Games (2026)	Succeeded by Kelantan
