= Television set (disambiguation) =

A television set is a device which receives television broadcasting.

Television set may also refer to:

- A television studio
- Set (film and TV scenery)
- The TV Set, a 2006 film

== See also ==
- Television (disambiguation)
