= TV (disambiguation) =

TV, or television, is a telecommunication medium for transmitting and receiving moving images and sound.

TV may also refer to:

== Arts and entertainment ==
- .tv (TV channel), a British technology channel, 1998–2001
- TV (The Book), a 2016 essay anthology
- Tribes: Vengeance (T:V), a 2004 FPS video game
- Taylor's Versions, a series of re-recorded Taylor Swift albums
- "TV", a song on Billie Eilish's 2022 EP Guitar Songs
- TV, a character in the fourth season of the animated web series Battle for Dream Island
- T.V., a character who is Jake the Dog's son in the animated series Adventure Time

== Medicine ==
- Tidal volume, the normal amount of air inspired and expired at rest
- Trichomonas vaginalis

== Places ==
=== Europe ===
- Titov Veles, a city in North Macedonia (vehicle prefix: TV)
- Trebišov, a town in Slovakia
- Province of Treviso, Italy (vehicle prefix: TV)

=== Elsewhere ===
- Tualatin Valley, a region of Oregon, United States
  - Tualatin Valley Highway
- Tuvalu, an island country (ISO 3166-1:TV)

== Science and technology ==
- Television set, a device used to view television broadcasts
- .tv, the country code top-level domain of Tuvalu
- TV Seastar, a jet aircraft
- Fokker T.V, a World War II bomber aircraft
- Shutter priority or TV, a setting on cameras that allows the user to choose a shutter speed
- Teravolt, a multiple of the SI-derived unit of electrical potential, the Volt
- TeamViewer, remote access computer software

== Other uses ==
- T–V distinction, in second-person pronouns
- Virgin Express (1996–2007; IATA:TV)
- Transvestite, a dated term for one who dresses as another gender
- Apple TV app, an app on iOS (labelled TV)

== See also ==
- Television (disambiguation)
- TVS (disambiguation)
- ITV (disambiguation)
- Mike Teavee, in Roald Dahl's 1964 novel Charlie and the Chocolate Factory
- TeeVee (cartoonist) (born 1944), Indian political cartoonist
- &TV, an Indian television station
