= Information Television Network =

Information Television Network, also known as ITV, is an American television production company based in Boca Raton, Florida. It was founded by Ed and Ana Cristina Lerner in 1992. The company specializes in creating health and wellness documentary-style programming and is best known for producing Healthy Body, Healthy Mind which airs on more than 200 PBS affiliates around the United States.

== History ==
Ed Lerner, a former ABC News documentary maker, founded the company with his wife Ana Cristina Lerner in order to create informational and educational programming that reflected the burgeoning Information Age. In 1992, ITV produced its first series, The Cutting Edge Medical Report, a documentary medical series hosted by Nancy Duerr which went on to a 10-year run of 200 half-hour episodes which aired on PBS. In 2004, The Cutting Edge Medical Report was revamped and became Healthy Body, Healthy Mind, a similar series but with an increased focus on health and wellness. As of May 2, 2016, a total of 300 episodes of Healthy Body, Healthy Mind have aired over the course of 32 seasons on more than 200 public television stations nationwide.

ITV also produced other educational televisions shows focused around children and teen health issues. In 1997, ITV produced Hall Pass, a syndicated teen news show, which ran for one season and featured the first television appearance of then 14-year-old Chyler Leigh as co-host. In 2002, ITV produced Kids HealthWorks, a documentary series on children's health which aired on Discovery Health Channel. In 2005, ITV produced E-Venture Kids, a pre-teen educational television pilot, which aired on more than 40 PBS stations and featured the first television acting appearance of then 12-year-old Ariana Grande.

== Programming ==
=== Original series ===
- The Cutting Edge Medical Report
- Healthy Body, Healthy Mind
- Kids HealthWorks

=== Original pilots ===
- E-Venture Kids

=== Mini-series ===
- The Art of Women's Health hosted by Nancy Duerr
