= TeeVee (cartoonist) =

TeeVee Indian is a political cartoonist who has worked primarily in the Telugu language. His real name is T. Venkatrao.

== Early years ==
He was born in Eluru in West Godavari district on 2 February 1944. He learnt cartooning through a correspondence course offered by the Ray Burns School of Cartooning. After completing his college degree, he joined the Telugu daily Visalaandhra in 1961 as a cartoonist.

== Work ==
His cartoons also appeared in newspapers like Andhra Prabha and Vaartha, and magazines like Andhra Jyothi and Chalana Chitra. In 1991, his cartoons also appeared in the Russian humour magazine Krokodil. He contributed articles on cartooning to Andhra Jyothi, Wisdom and the Sunday editions of various newspapers, besides writing instructional books on the subject and conducting courses in cartooning.

== Achievements ==
TeeVee received a Lifetime Achievement award from the Indian Institute of Cartoonists in 2009.

== Books ==
Venkatrao, Ṭ., 1944-. Ṭīvī Rājakīya Kārṭūnulu, 1962-1997 =: Teevee's Political Cartoons, 1962-1997. Vijayavāḍa: Citrasūtra Pracuraṇalu, 1997.
