= Television (disambiguation) =

Television is a telecommunication medium used for transmitting and receiving moving images and sound.

Television may also refer to:

- Television program
- Television set
- The whole area of television, for example as an art form, or as an engineering discipline.

== Music ==
- Television (band), an American rock band

=== Albums ===
- Television (Television album), 1992
- Television (Dr. John album), 1994
- Television (Baaba Maal album), 2009

=== Singles and songs ===
- "Television" (Dave Edmunds song), a 1978 single from Tracks on Wax 4
- "Television" (The Verve Pipe song), a 1999 single from The Verve Pipe
- "Television", a song by Hard-Fi from Once Upon a Time in the West
- "Television", a song by Stabbing Westward from their self-titled album
- "Television", a song by Sunny Day Real Estate from The Rising Tide
- "Television", a song by Idles from Joy as an Act of Resistance
- "Television, the Drug of the Nation", a 1992 single by The Disposable Heroes Of Hiphoprisy from Hypocrisy Is the Greatest Luxury

== Films and television ==
- Television (2012 film), a 2012 Bengali film
- Television (1931 film), a 1931 American comedy film
- "Television" (Stewart Lee's Comedy Vehicle), a 2009 television episode

== Other uses ==
- The Television, Japanese entertainment magazine

== See also ==
- Television set (disambiguation)
- TV (disambiguation)
- Televise (album), 2003 album by Calla
