= Kolej Laila Taib =

College in Sarawak, Malaysia

Kolej Laila Taib (abbreviated KLT; formerly known as Kolej Bersatu Sarawak) is a private higher educational institution in Sarawak, Malaysia which was established in 1998.

Kolej Laila Taib (KLT) was established on 1 March 2010 in honour of Laila Taib (wife of former chief minister Abdul Taib Mahmud).

Kolej Laila Taib was chosen to carry on Datuk Patinggi's legacy due to its unprecedented academic records and achievements which it had achieved throughout its 13 years history prior to being renamed as KLT. Here, her legacy is carried on through KLT, which thrives on the promise of excellence and delivering the best for its students by ensuring that the future generations of Sarawakians enjoy a wide and unprecedented access to tertiary education. This has clearly been proven by the fact that KT students with Laila Taib Scholarship, do not pay any programmes fees for the entirety of their diploma programmes. This ensures that students attain, at least, their diploma qualifications without any financial burden.

KLT offers six diploma programmes, which are accounting, architecture, civil engineering, quantity surveying, business management and electrical & electronic Engineering. All the programmes are accredited by Malaysian Qualification Agency (MQA) and recognized by Jabatan Perkhidmatan Awam (JPA).
