= LTV =

LTV may refer to:

== Television ==
- Lagos Television, a TV channel in Nigeria.
- Lanarkshire TV, a defunct local television channel in Scotland - later replaced by Thistle TV
- Latvijas Televīzija, Latvian Television
- LRT televizija, formerly LTV, Lithuanian National Television
- LTV Ethiopia, a private satellite TV channel in Ethiopia
- Lumiere TV, a TV channel in Cyprus
- LTV (Lebanon), a lebanese TV channel in Lebanon

== Other ==
- Labor theory of value, a theory of value in Marxist economics
- Lichfield Trent Valley railway station, England; National Rail station code LTV
- Ling-Temco-Vought, former US conglomerate and aerospace firm, later LTV Corporation, LTV Steel
  - Vought, formerly named LTV Aerospace while owned by Ling-Temco-Vought
- Loan-to-value ratio, of an asset
- Customer lifetime value in marketing, also known as life-time value (LTV)
- Long-term validation in the electronic signature, allowing electronically signed documents to remain valid for long periods (long term validity) even if underlying cryptographic algorithms or the other certificates expired.
- Lunar Terrain Vehicle -- lunar surface rover for the Artemis program.
