= TVS (Malaysian TV channel) =

Sarawak free-to-air digital television channel

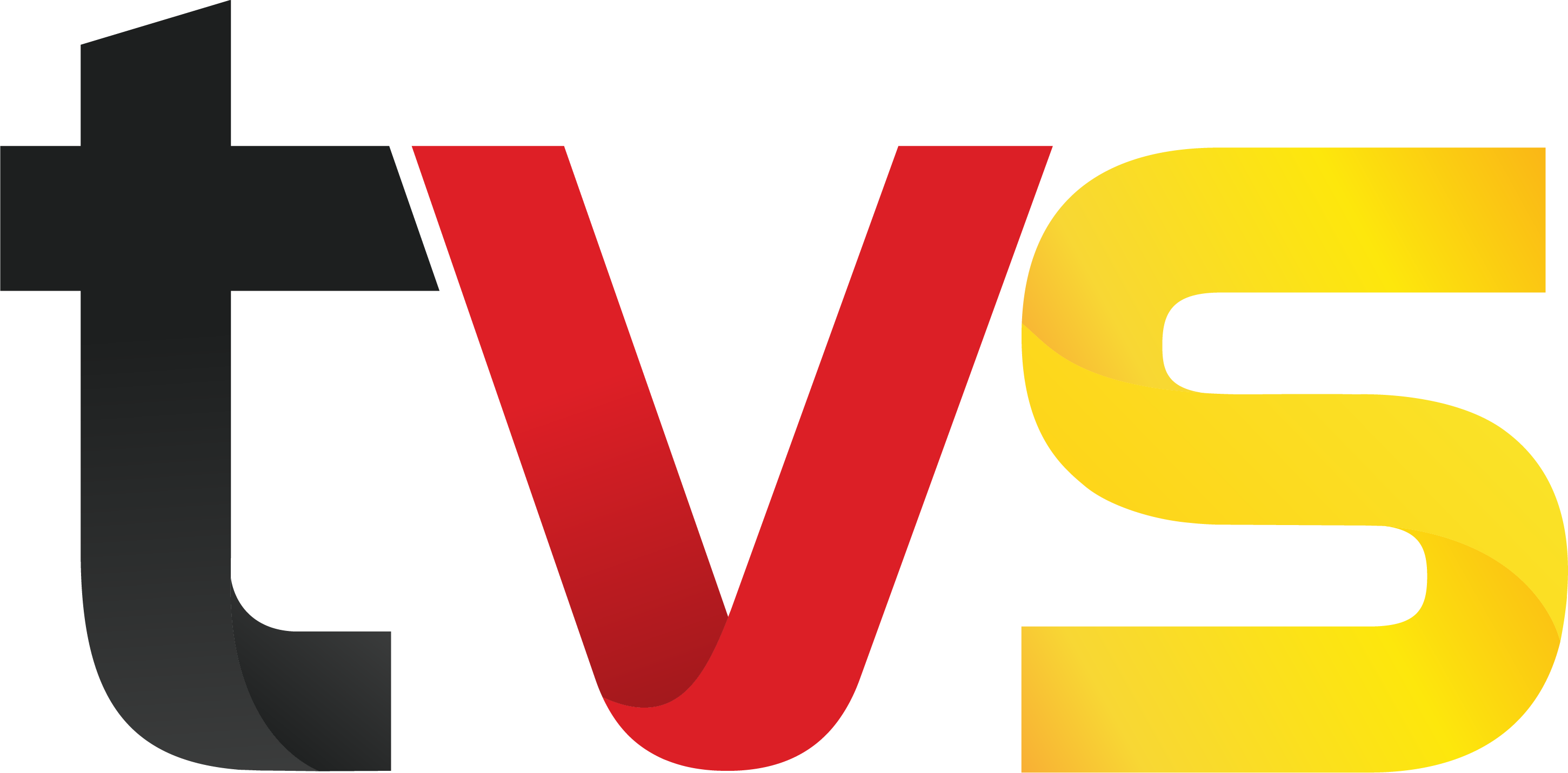
- Inspire your world Inspirasi duniamu
- Country: Malaysia
- Broadcast area: Malaysia; Singapore; Brunei; Thailand (South Thailand, particularly Songkhla, Narathiwat, Yala and Satun); Indonesia (West Kalimantan, Riau Islands, East Kalimantan, North Kalimantan and Riau); Philippines (Balabac, Palawan and Tawi-Tawi)
- Headquarters: LG12, Lower Ground Floor, Mall 2, CityOne Megamall, No. 1, Jalan Song, 93350 Kuching, Sarawak, Malaysia

Programming
- Languages: Malay; English; Iban; Mandarin; Filipino; Indonesian
- Picture format: 1080i (16:9/HDTV)

Ownership
- Owner: Sarawak Media Group
- Key people: Dato Norhyati Ismail (President); Haji Kushairi Abang (Chief Executive Officer); Sarbini Hamdan (Executive Director)

History
- Launched: 30 October 2014; 12 years ago (TV Sarawak); 10 October 2020; 6 years ago (TVS)
- Closed: 9 October 2020; 6 years ago (TV Sarawak)
- Former names: TV Sarawak (2014 - 2020)

Links
- Website: tvsarawak.my

Availability

Terrestrial
- MYTV: Channel 122 (HD)

Streaming media
- MYTV: MYTV Mana Mana / Video On Demand

TVS (an initialism of its former name, TV Sarawak) is a Malaysian free-to-air linear digital television channel that provides news and programming from Sarawak to the state and other parts of Malaysia.

== History ==
Plans for an independent regional Sarawakian broadcaster were discussed since 2017 under the state government of Chief Minister Abang Johari Tun Openg who had complained of indifference in coverage of state affairs from mainstream Kuala Lumpur-based broadcasters. Radio Televisyen Malaysia (RTM), which had previously ran Televisyen Malaysia Rangkaian Ketiga specifically for Sabah and Sarawak from 1975 to 1984, planned to relaunch a television station for Sarawak as part of the Government's digitalization plan for Malaysian television. The plan did not come to fruition as it was replaced by OKEY, and the state television plan was later undertaken by a private company to be launched as a streaming channel.

The free-to-air license was eventually given the green light in an announcement by Sim Kui Hian, Sarawak's Minister for Local Government and Housing. The station would be given an early broadcast on 10 October 2020, in conjunction with the Yang di-Pertua Negeri of Sarawak's birthday before officially launching on the night of 11 October 2020.

On 15 October 2020, TVS became the main partner of the National Film Development Corporation Malaysia (FINAS) and would finance its produced work.

In 2023, TVS planned to cooperate with regional TV stations as part of its plan to expand the creative industry in Sarawak.

Ahead of New Year's Day 2024, TVS launched a new logo based on the colors of the Sarawak flag and at the same time, it proposed to open a branch office in three locations in Sarawak as well as in Kuala Lumpur by the first quarter of 2024. TVS regional offices were opened in Miri and Subang Jaya, in July and October 2024 respectively.

== Logo history ==
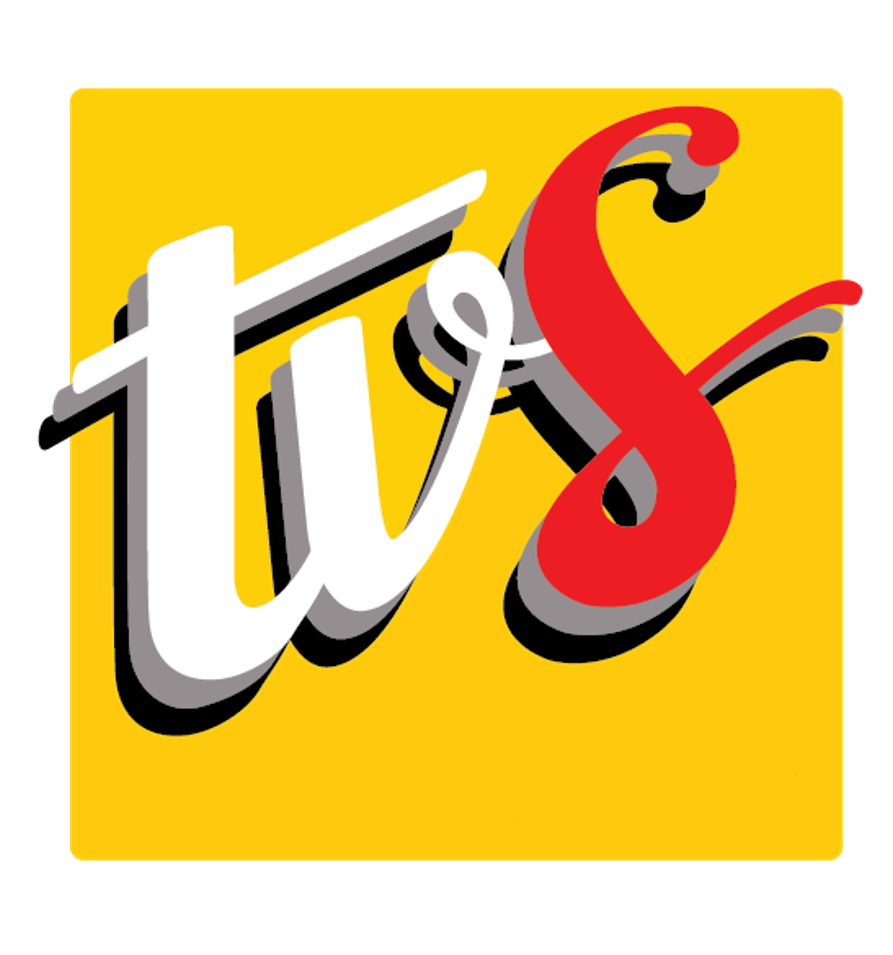
TVS logo used from 2019 to 2020.

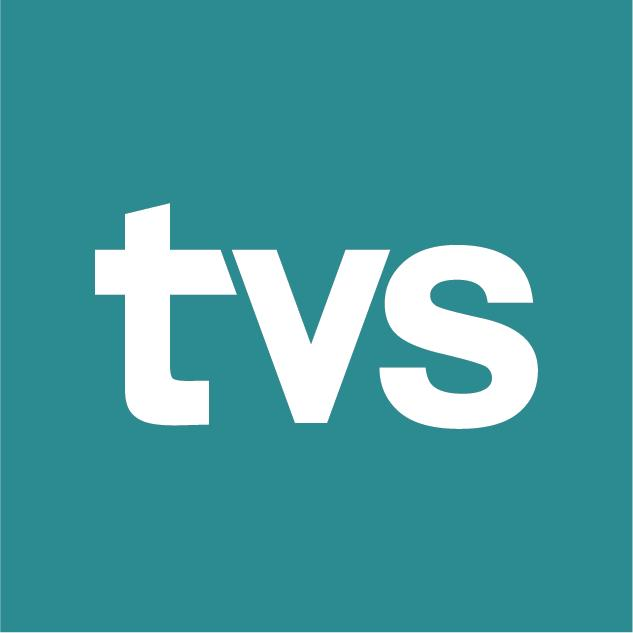
TVS logo used from 10 October 2020, until 30 December 2023.

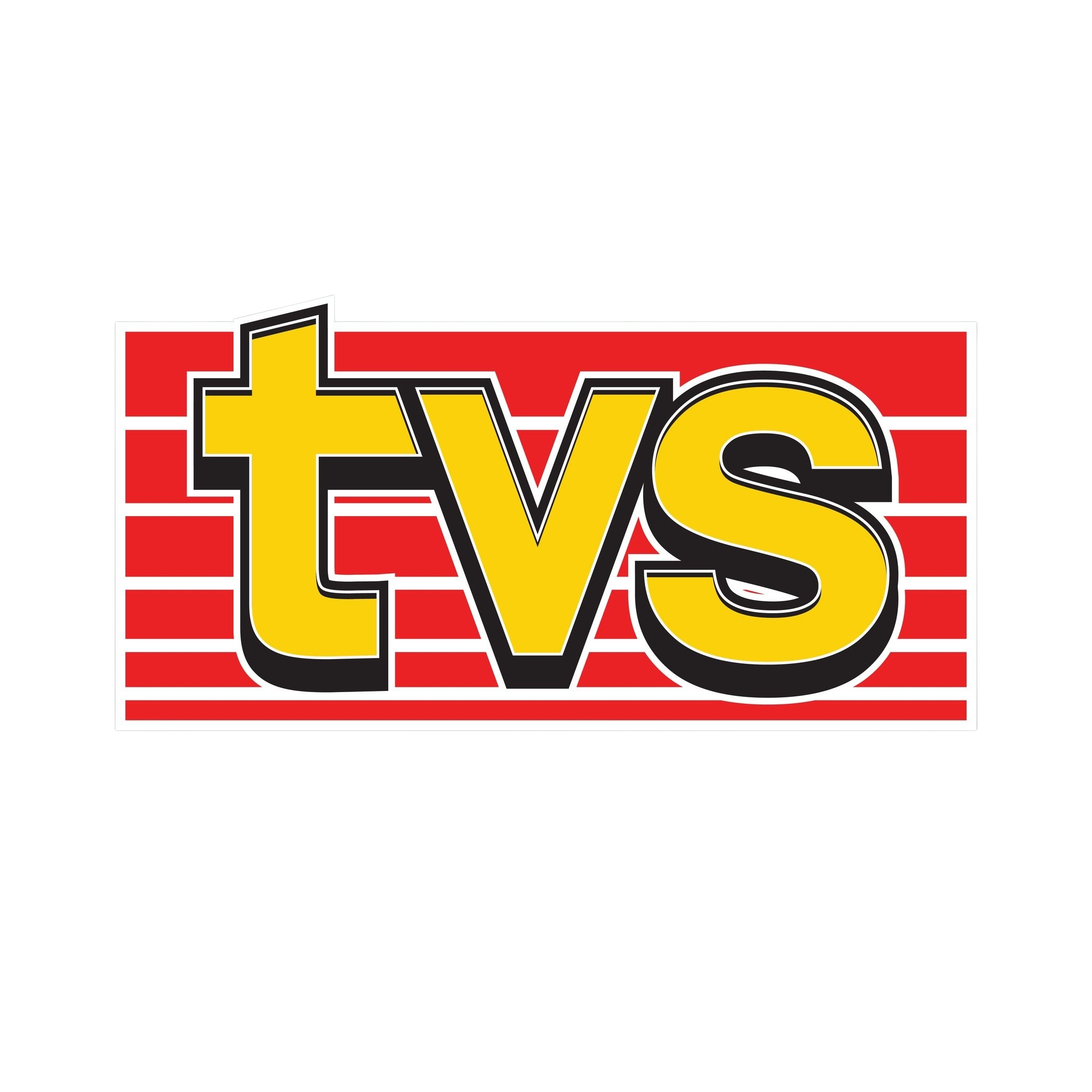
TVS logo used from 24 November 2023, until 30 December 2023.

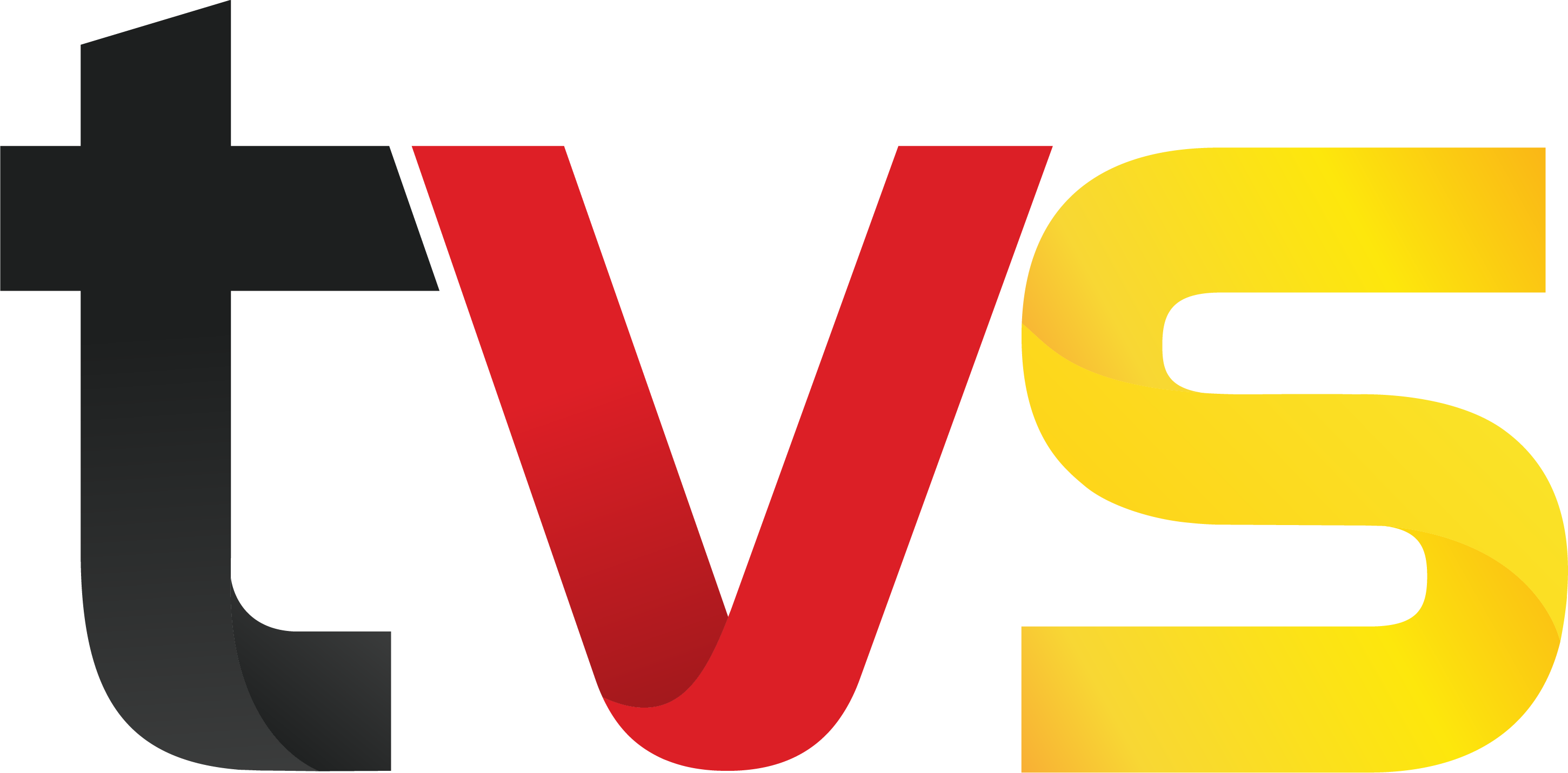
TVS logo used since 31 December 2023.

== Awards and accolades ==
Year	Award-giving body	Category	Recipient	Result	Ref.
2024	The BrandLaureate Best Brands Awards	Visionary Tech	TVS	Won	
2025	Asia Pacific Broadcasting Awards	Government Streaming - Malaysia	TVS (2024 Sarawak Regatta)	Won	
2025	Asia Pacific Broadcasting Awards	Live Event Streaming - Malaysia	TVS (2024 Sukma Games & 2024 Para Sukma Games)	Won	
2026	The Asia-Pacific Broadcasting Union (ABU) (Together for Planet, People and Peace (T4P)) Media Awards	Television Category - Planet	TVS (Wingbeats of Borneo)	Runner-up	
2026	The BrandLaureate Best Brands Awards	Nation’s Pride Excellence in Corporate Branding and Media Development	Sarawak Media Group (TVS)	Won	

== See also ==
- Television in Malaysia
- List of television stations in Malaysia
