= Independent Television (Tanzania) =

Tanzanian commercial TV network

Independent Television (abbreviated as ITV) is a commercial television network in Tanzania owned by IPP Media.

== History ==
Independent Television started broadcasting on 10 June 1994, from a transmitter in Dar es Salaam on UHF channel 24. As of 2003 it had 17% of the total advertising expenditure in the country, with reception terrestrially in areas of high economic activity, and also by satellite. The station aside from the main UHF transmitter had four VHF relayers, in Mwanza (channel 10), Dodoma (channel 11), Moshi (channel 9) and Arusha (channel 6). The coverage was limited in accordance with the regulator, that suggested at the time (2003) that any operator shouldn't broadcast to more than 25% of the national territory.

Regular service started in August 1994. After an initial period dedicating airtime to the 1994 FIFA World Cup, it ran from 5pm to 11pm, featuring local music, a children's programme, Neighbours and a mix of local and foreign dramas and feature films. The channel entered an agreement with Multichoice to provide subscription television at the time, but at the end of 1995 the project had yet reached its fruition.

ITV in its early years generally broadcast from 12pm to 12am, however on special events line with the 1996 Summer Olympics, ITV extended its broadcast hours.

On 2 November 1995, ITV opened its new digital uplink facility at Mikocheni, the facility was formally opened by President Ali Hassan Mwinyi.

In July 1996, ITV already had a substantial amount of local programmes, as well as relays of Euronews, Deutsche Welle and BBC World content. ITV within two years became the most-watched channel in Dar es Salaam alone, with 62% of viewers tuning in.

ITV launched its second channel (the current EATV) covering Dar es Salaam and the Coastal region in 2000. The main ITV channel made heavy, cheap relays of MCM Africa, which in exchange offered Tambala music videos filmed by ITV to the network. In January 2001, it joined the African Broadcast Network.

In 2013, ITV won the Superbrands award as the number-one brand overall in Tanzania and was recognized as one of the 100 most influential brands in East Africa from 2015 to 2017.
