= 2022 Sukma Games =

Multi-sport event in Kuala Lumpur, Malaysia

XX Sukma Games
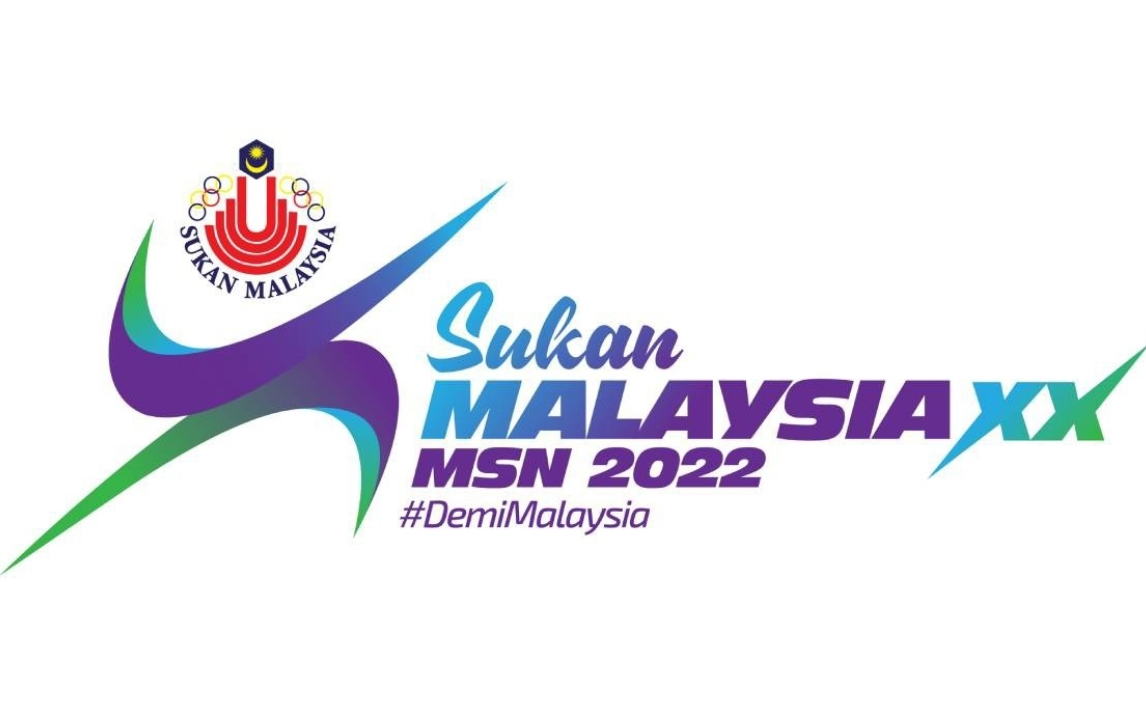
- Host city: Kuala Lumpur
- Motto: #DemiMalaysia (#ForMalaysia)
- Events: 426 in 31 sports (38 disciplines)
- Opening: 17 September
- Closing: 24 September
- Opened by: Ismail Sabri Yaakob; Prime Minister of Malaysia
- Closed by: Ahmad Faizal Azumu; Minister of Youth and Sports
- Main venue: Dataran Gemilang, UKM, Bangi
- Website: 2022 Sukma Games

The 2022 Sukma Games (Malay: Sukan Malaysia 2022), officially known as the 20th Sukma Games (Malay: Sukan Malaysia ke-20) and commonly known as MSN 2022, was a multi-sport event that was held in Kuala Lumpur from 16 September until 24 September 2022. Though some events, such as the football, cricket and cycling event, started earlier. The Games were originally scheduled to be held in Johor in July 2020. However, they were postponed until 2022 due to the COVID-19 pandemic, with the National Sports Council (NSC) replacing Johor as host.

== Venues ==
All sporting events were held in the Klang Valley area, except for sailing which was held in Langkawi, Kedah.

=== Kuala Lumpur ===
- Jalan Duta Sports Complex – Tennis
- Jalan Duta Squash Complex – Squash
- Kuala Lumpur Petanque Arena – Petanque
- Bukit Kiara Sports Complex
  - Juara Stadium – Netball
  - National Lawn bowls Centre – Lawn bowls
- KL Sports City
  - Bukit Jalil National Stadium – Athletics
  - Axiata Arena – Badminton
  - Malaysia National Hockey Stadium – Hockey
  - National Aquatic Centre – Aquatics (Diving, Swimming)
  - National Squash Centre – Squash
  - National Sports Council Gymnasium 1 – Gymnastics (Rhythmic)
  - National Sports Council Gymnasium 2 – Wushu
  - National Sports Council Gymnasium 3 – Gymnastics (Artistic)
- Kuala Lumpur Stadium – Football
- Malaysia Basketball Association Stadium – Basketball
- Quill City Mall – E-sports
- University of Malaya – Football

=== Selangor ===
- Shah Alam City Council Section 4 Hall – Volleyball
- Shah Alam City Council Section 19 Hall – Volleyball
- Shah Alam City Council Section 19 Beach volleyball Venue – Beach volleyball
- National University of Malaysia Football Field – Football
- National University of Malaysia Oval – Cricket
- National University of Malaysia Dataran Gemilang Square – Opening and closing ceremonies
- Universiti Teknologi MARA Football Field – Football
- Universiti Teknologi MARA Sports Complex Hall – Judo, Karate
- Universiti Teknologi MARA Rugby Field – Rugby sevens
- Universiti Tenaga Nasional Football Field – Football
- Universiti Tenaga Nasional Dewan Sri Sarjana Hall – Sepak takraw
- Selangor Turf Club – Cricket
- South City Plaza, Seri Kembangan – Muay Thai
- Subang National Golf Club – Golf
- Subang National Shooting Range – Shooting
- Sunway Megalanes, Sunway Pyramid – Bowling

=== Putrajaya ===
- Precinct 18 Futsal Complex – Boxing
- Precinct 6 Water Sports Complex – Canoeing
- Precinct 11 Neighbourhood Complex – Weightlifting
- Putrajaya Challenge Park – Cycling (Mountain biking)

=== Negeri Sembilan ===
- Bandar Sri Sendayan, Seremban – Cycling (road)
- National Velodrome of Malaysia, Nilai – Cycling (BMX, Track)
- Universiti Sains Islam Malaysia Stadium – Archery
- Universiti Sains Islam Malaysia Dewan Tuanku Canselor Hall – Pencak silat

=== Kedah ===
- National Sailing Training Centre, Langkawi – Sailing

=== Athletes' villages ===
- Universiti Teknologi MARA Shah Alam Main Campus
- Universiti Tenaga Nasional, Kajang
- National University of Malaysia, Bangi
- University of Malaya, Kuala Lumpur
- Dayang Bay Service Apartment & Resort, Langkawi
- Malaysia Paralympic Sports Excellence Centre, Kampung Pandan (Demonstration sports)

== The games ==
=== Participating states ===
- Johor
- Kedah
- Kelantan
- Malacca
- Negeri Sembilan
- Pahang
- Penang
- Perak
- Perlis
- Sabah
- Sarawak
- Selangor
- Terengganu
- Federal Territories
- Brunei

=== Sports ===
- Aquatics
  - Diving (5)
  - Swimming (38)
- Archery (14)
- Athletics (44)
- Badminton (5)
- Basketball
  - Basketball (2)
  - 3×3 Basketball (2)
- Bowling (11)
- Boxing (12)
- Canoeing (33)
- Cricket (1)
- Cycling
  - Road (8)
  - Track (16)
  - BMX (2)
  - Mountain bike (4)
- Esports (5)
- Field hockey (2)
- Football (1)
- Golf (4)
- Gymnastics
  - Artistic (14)
  - Rhythmic (5)
- Judo (15)
- Karate (16)
- Lawn bowls (9)
- Muay Thai (16)
- Netball (1)
- Pencak silat (26)
- Petanque (11)
- Rugby sevens (2)
- Sailing (14)
- Sepak takraw (5)
- Shooting (26)
- Squash (5)
- Tennis (5)
- Volleyball
  - Volleyball (2)
  - Beach volleyball (2)
- Weightlifting (16)
- Wushu (25)

==== Demonstration sports ====
- Kabaddi (2)
- Silambam (12)

=== Calendar ===
OC	Opening ceremony	●	Event competitions	1	Gold medal events	CC	Closing ceremony

September 2022		12th Mon	13th Tue	14th Wed	15th Thu	16th Fri	17th Sat	18th Sun	19th Mon	20th Tue	21st Wed	22nd Thu	23rd Fri	24th Sat	Events
Ceremonies							OC							CC	
Aquatics	Diving									2	2	1			5
Aquatics	Swimming								8	8	7	8	7		38
Archery							4	●	●	●	5	5			14
Athletics					7	11	10	16							44
Badminton										●	●	●	●	5	5
Basketball	Basketball				●	●	●	●	●	●	2				2
Basketball	3×3 Basketball											●	2		2
Bowling								2	4	1	2	2			11
Boxing							●	●	●	●	●	●	6	6	12
Canoeing								6	6	10	3	3	5		33
Cricket					●	●	●	●	●	●	●	●	●	1	1
Cycling	Road cycling			2	2	2	2								8
Cycling	Track cycling								4	4	4	4			16
Cycling	BMX						●	2							2
Cycling	Mountain biking											●	2	2	4
E-sports							●	●	5						5
Field hockey					●	●	●	●	●	●	●	●	2		2
Football		●	●	●	●	●	●	●	●	●	●	●	1		1
Gymnastics	Artistic						2	2	10						14
Gymnastics	Rhythmic										●	2	5		7
Golf										●	●	4			4
Judo										3	6	6			15
Karate					7	7	2								16
Lawn bowls						●	●	●	4	1	●	●	●	4	9
Muay Thai							2	●	●	●	14				16
Netball									●	●	●	●	●	1	1
Pencak silat										●	8	●	9	9	26
Petanque							2	●	4	●	3	●	2		11
Rugby sevens									●	●	●	2			2
Sailing								●	●	●	●	●	14		14
Sepak takraw				●	●	●	1	●	●	2	●	2			5
Shooting								6	6	6	4	3	1		26
Squash							●	●	●	2	●	●	3		5
Tennis							●	●	●	●	●	●	5		5
Volleyball	Beach volleyball							●	●	●	●	2			2
Volleyball	Volleyball						●	●	●	●	●	1	1		2
Weightlifting									4	4	4	4			16
Wushu				8	7	10									23
Daily medal events		0	0	10	23	30	25	34	55	43	64	49	65	28	426
Cummulative total		0	0	10	33	63	88	122	177	220	284	333	398	426	426
September 2022		12th Mon	13th Tue	14th Wed	15th Thu	16th Fri	17th Sat	18th Sun	19th Mon	20th Tue	21st Wed	22nd Thu	23rd Fri	24th Sat	Events

== Medal table ==
* Host nation (Federal Territories)

2022 Sukma Games medal table
Rank	State	Gold	Silver	Bronze	Total
1	Johor	77	52	43	172
2	Terengganu	64	49	56	169
3	Federal Territories*	55	68	64	187
4	Sarawak	32	43	52	127
5	Selangor	31	55	44	130
6	Sabah	30	29	39	98
7	Penang	30	28	42	100
8	Perak	27	28	46	101
9	Pahang	22	21	27	70
10	Negeri Sembilan	19	6	28	53
11	Malacca	17	11	23	51
12	Kedah	16	17	30	63
13	Perlis	6	7	10	23
14	Kelantan	3	8	10	21
15	Brunei	0	2	2	4
Totals (15 entries)		429	424	516	1,369

== Para Sukma Games ==
=== Venue list ===
- Para Badminton (2–6 November) - Juara Stadium, Bukit Kiara
- Boccia (2–6 November) - Kampung Pandan Paralympic Sports Excellence Centre
- Para Archery (2–6 November) - NSC Field, KL Sports City
- Para Athletics (3–6 November) - NSC Mini Stadium, KL Sports City
- Para Powerlifting (2–5 November) - Kampung Pandan Paralympic Sports Excellence Centre
- Para Swimming (3–6 November) - KL Sports City Aquatic Centre
- Para Bowling (2–5 November) - Sunway Megalane, Sunway Pyramid
- Para Chess (2–6 November) - Banquet Hall, Casa 4, NSC, KL Sports City
- Para Lawn Bowls (1–6 November) - Bukit Kiara Sports Complex
- Para Table Tennis (2–6 November) - Gymnasium 2, NSC Sports Complex, KL Sports City

=== Para Sukma Medal table ===
* Host nation (Kuala Lumpur)

2022 Para Sukma Games medal table
Rank	State	Gold	Silver	Bronze	Total
1	Sabah	54	36	35	125
2	Sarawak	50	47	49	146
3	Johor	38	30	25	93
4	Selangor	28	26	24	78
5	Perak	25	15	14	54
6	Penang	15	15	13	43
7	Negeri Sembilan	14	11	10	35
8	Kedah	11	16	11	38
9	Kelantan	10	16	10	36
10	Malacca	9	19	12	40
11	Kuala Lumpur*	9	16	26	51
12	Pahang	9	6	4	19
13	Terengganu	8	19	8	35
14	Perlis	8	6	2	16
15	Labuan	2	1	4	7
Totals (15 entries)		290	279	247	816

== Concerns and controversies ==
=== The Weightlifting Doping Scandal and MWF's Withdrawal ===
The biggest controversy involved a massive standoff regarding doping tests in weightlifting.

- Pre-Tournament Doping: A few days before the games, three male weightlifters (two from Terengganu and one from Perlis) failed pre-tournament doping tests.
- The Standoff: The Malaysian Weightlifting Federation (PABM/MWF) had a strict rule that if any athlete from a state tested positive, the entire state delegation for weightlifting must be suspended. However, the National Sports Council (NSC/MSN) disagreed, choosing instead to ban only the specific compromised individuals to protect the clean athletes.
- MWF Pulls Out: In protest against the NSC's leniency, MWF completely withdrew from managing SUKMA 2022 Games and pulled all its accredited technical officials. The event went ahead using NSC’s own officials, meaning any national records set during the games were not officially recognised by the national body.
- Post-Games Doping Positives: To add to the issue, two subsequent medal-winning weightlifters tested positive for anabolic androgenic steroids after the games concluded.

=== Sudden dropping of 12 events ===
Weeks before the games, the NSC announced the cancellation of 12 sporting events across various disciplines, including athletics and diving.

- The Cause: The games had a strict rule requiring a minimum registration of six states per event. Last-minute withdrawals by certain states left those 12 events under-enrolled, forcing their removal.
- The Backlash: This drew heavy criticism from former sports officials and fans. Many pointed out that it severely discouraged female athletic participation and wasted years of preparation for athletes in core disciplines like women's field events. The Ministry of Youth and Sports had to explicitly deny any allegations of "sabotage".

=== Non-Recognition of Event Records ===
Due to the disruptions caused by the COVID-19 pandemic, the maximum age limit for athletes at SUKMA 2022 was exceptionally extended from 21 to 23 years old to allow sidelined athletes a chance to compete. Because older, more mature athletes were competing against standard youth categories, the NSC ruled that no records broken during the 2022 Games would be recognised as official new tournament records. This caused significant heartbreak for outstanding athletes like Pahang's Muhammad Ikbolasen, who shattered a 26-year-old 10,000-meter record but had it voided under the blanket technicality.
