= Thomas Overton (disambiguation) =

Thomas Overton was an American military and political leader.

Thomas Overton may also refer to:

- Thomas Overton (MP for Northampton) MP for Northampton (UK Parliament constituency)
- Thomas Overton (MP for Sandwich), in 1510, MP for Sandwich (UK Parliament constituency)
- Tom Overton (1930–1988), American sound engineer
- Thomas Mitchell Overton (1955–2026), American murderer convicted of the 1991 murders of Michael and Missy MacIvor
