= Jeffery Lee =

American convicted murderer (1976–2026)

- Mug shot of Lee
- Born: Jeffery James Lee; December 26, 1976; Alabama, U.S.
- Died: September 17, 2026 (aged 49); Holman Correctional Facility, Atmore, Alabama, U.S.
- Other name: Jeffrey Lee
- Children: 2
- Status: Executed by lethal injection
- Convictions: Capital murder (x2); Attempted murder
- Penalty: Death (October 11, 2000)

Details
- Date: December 12, 1998
- Country: United States
- State: Alabama
- Killed: Jimmy Ellis, 53; Elaine Thompson, 44
- Injured: Helen King
- Imprisoned at: Holman Correctional Facility

Jeffery James Lee (December 26, 1976 – September 17, 2026) was an American convicted murderer sentenced to death in Alabama. Lee was found guilty of murdering American singer Jimmy Ellis and Elaine Thompson during a pawn shop robbery on December 12, 1998. Lee was also convicted of shooting Helen King in the same attack. Despite the jury's 7–5 vote for life without parole in his 2000 murder trial, Lee was sentenced to death by the trial judge through judicial override, a controversial practice that was eventually abolished in Alabama.

Lee's execution was originally scheduled to be carried out by nitrogen hypoxia on June 11, 2026. However, it was ultimately stayed due to the federal courts finding it unconstitutional to execute Lee by nitrogen hypoxia, an execution method which became increasingly controversial due to several inmates allegedly experiencing severe pain or suffering during prior executions in the state.

After his execution was stayed, the state filed litigation to re-schedule Lee's execution via lethal injection, and Lee was eventually executed on September 17, 2026, after the Alabama Supreme Court and Governor Kay Ivey authorized his new death warrant.

Lee was a board member of Project Hope to Abolish the Death Penalty, an anti-death penalty group composed of death row inmates.

== Background ==
Jeffery James Lee was born on December 26, 1976, in Alabama, the third of seven children. Lee was raised in an impoverished household and was physically and psychologically abused by his father and mother. Despite these challenges, school records showed that Lee generally performed well in school until the 11th grade, when his academic performance began to decline. Sources revealed that Lee's history of substance abuse began at the age of seven, when he first started to sniff gasoline, and he first consumed alcohol at age 11. During his adolescence, Lee abused drugs such as cocaine and marijuana. By the time of his arrest for murder in 1998, Lee had fathered two children with his then girlfriend.

== 1998 pawn shop murders ==
On December 12, 1998, in Orrville, Alabama, Jeffery Lee, then 21 years old, committed a robbery at a local pawn shop owned by American singer Jimmy Ellis, during which Ellis and his ex-wife and partner Elaine Thompson were shot dead. Ellis, under the stage name Orion, was famous for his vocals that resembled the late singer Elvis Presley.

Hours before the murders, Lee entered the pawn shop with his brother and cousin. Lee looked at wedding rings on the pretext of wanting to buy one, telling shop employee Helen King that he had no money but would return with some later. Ellis and Thompson were also in the shop. After giving King the fake name "Chris Williams", Lee departed with the other two men. Lee then drank and smoked cocaine-laced marijuana elsewhere, then went back to the store.

Lee entered the store and uttered an expletive before opening fire with a sawed-off shotgun. First, he shot Ellis in the left arm, before shooting Thompson point-blank in the face. He then shot King in the hand, and after King collapsed, she played dead to avoid getting shot further. Lee then shot Ellis in the chest and tried to wrench open the store's cash register, but failed to do so and left. After Lee was gone, King used the telephone to contact the police. The crime was caught on the shop's CCTV cameras, proving Lee was the perpetrator.

Autopsy results showed that Ellis died of a gunshot wound to the chest and also sustained multiple shotgun wounds on his body. Thompson also died from the gunshot to her face.

== Arrest and trial ==
A day after the double murder, Jeffery Lee was arrested as a suspect behind the killings at a motel in the state of Georgia. Lee's 19-year-old brother and a 17-year-old juvenile (Lee's cousin) were also arrested in connection with the murders on the same day it happened. After his arrest, Lee confessed to the shooting, but claimed that the first shot was fired accidentally.

After his arrest, Lee was charged with one count of attempted murder and two counts of capital murder, for which, under Alabama law, Lee could face the death penalty if convicted. The murder charges were classified as capital given that the killings occurred during the course of a robbery or an attempted robbery, and a third count of capital murder was added for the killing of multiple people in a single event. Lee's brother and the juvenile were also charged in the same case, but only Lee was put on trial by 2000.

In April 2000, at the end of his murder trial, Lee was found guilty of one count of attempted murder and two counts of capital murder by a Dallas County jury. The same jury also voted 7–5 to recommend sentences of life imprisonment without the possibility of parole for both capital murder counts.

On October 11, 2000, Dallas County Circuit Judge Jack Meigs overrode the jury's recommended sentence of life without parole, and formally sentenced Lee to death by the electric chair for the murders of Elaine Thompson and Jimmy Ellis. In his verdict, Judge Meigs explained why Lee should be sentenced to death, stating that Lee had shot all the three victims "with cold precision and premeditation", and added that the victims themselves were people "who were doing nothing more than trying to earn a living", and he therefore decided to impose the death penalty. Apart from the two death sentences, Lee was also sentenced to life imprisonment for the attempted murder of Helen King.

Over the following years after his trial, Lee's death sentence became a subject of controversy, given that Lee was sentenced to death in spite of the jury's vote for life imprisonment, and the practice of judicial override was often argued by several inmates' lawyers to have breached the constitution and also the Fifth, Sixth, Eighth and 14th Amendments.

In April 2017, the lawmakers of Alabama passed a new bill to abolish the judicial override prerogative, allowing only juries to have a final say on sentence rather than judges; Governor Kay Ivey signed the bill into law. However, the law was not retroactive and Lee's death sentence was still in effect. A bill was subsequently proposed to make the law retroactive and re-sentence death row inmates who were affected by judicial override. This bill was, however, rejected by the state lawmakers in April 2024. A May 2024 report revealed that Lee was among 30 inmates on Alabama's death row who had been sentenced through judicial override and still awaiting execution.

== Appellate process ==
On October 26, 2001, the Alabama Court of Criminal Appeals dismissed Lee's direct appeal from his death sentence. Two years later, the Alabama Court of Criminal Appeals affirmed Lee's capital murder convictions and denied his appeal. Lee was among three capital murder defendants (another one of whom was also on death row) whose appeals were unsuccessful before the court that day. On October 9, 2009, Lee's post-conviction petition was again rejected by the Alabama Court of Criminal Appeals. On August 1, 2013, the 11th Circuit Court of Appeals dismissed Lee's appeal.

On March 3, 2014, Lee's final appeal was turned down by the U.S. Supreme Court. Four years later, Lee once again appealed to the U.S. Supreme Court, but the appeal was denied on April 2, 2018.

== June 2026 execution attempt ==
In February 2026, Alabama attorney general Steve Marshall filed a motion seeking to schedule the execution dates of both Jeffery Lee and Michael Shannon Taylor, who was convicted of killing Ivan and Lucille Moore during a 1991 robbery attempt.

Lee's death warrant was eventually approved by the Alabama Supreme Court. On April 15, 2026, Alabama governor Kay Ivey ordered Lee's execution to be carried out via nitrogen hypoxia on June 11, 2026. Lee was Alabama's first condemned inmate to have his death sentence scheduled after convicted murderer Charles Lee Burton's death sentence was commuted to life without parole by Governor Ivey two days before his execution date in March of that same year.

At the time when Lee's execution was scheduled, Lee's lawsuit challenging the use of nitrogen hypoxia as a method of execution, filed a year before, was pending in federal court. On May 29, 2026, U.S. district judge Emily C. Marks dismissed Lee's appeal and ruled that his execution should move forward as scheduled. She stated that Lee did not substantially prove that the method of nitrogen hypoxia was cruel and unusual even though there was some degree of suffering through this method by causing severe air hunger for one to three minutes.

On June 8, 2026, the 11th Circuit Court of Appeals reversed the ruling of Judge Marks and remitted the case back to the lower courts for another hearing, raising concerns regarding the constitutionality of nitrogen gas executions. While they did not stay Lee's execution, the court stated that the lower courts needed to determine whether Lee's proposed alternative of execution by firing squad was feasible.

On June 9, 2026, two days before Lee's scheduled execution, District Judge Marks issued a court order that permanently enjoined the state from executing Lee by nitrogen hypoxia, ruling that the method potentially constituted "cruel and unusual punishment" in accordance with the Eighth Amendment. The next day, the 11th Circuit Court of Appeals rejected the state prosecution's appeal to overturn Judge Marks's order that prevented them from deploying nitrogen gas for Lee's execution.

On June 11, 2026, the date of Lee's scheduled execution, the U.S. Supreme Court, through a majority ruling of 6–3, denied the state's motion to lift the stay of execution, without formally addressing the merits of his Eighth Amendment challenge to the use of nitrogen hypoxia. In response to the verdict, Attorney General Marshall stated that the state would continue to seek justice for the victims' families and ensure that Lee's sentence be lawfully carried out, and labelled the court's decision as a "miscarriage of justice" for the victims and their surviving kin. Governor Ivey released a statement, saying that the state could still apply to carry out Lee's death sentence via a different execution method on another date, and affirmed her commitment to serving justice for the families of Ellis and Thompson.

== Second death warrant and execution ==
The day after his execution was stayed, Alabama attorney general Steve Marshall filed a new motion seeking another execution date for Lee, and requested that Lee be executed by the default method of lethal injection. In the filing, the state's contention was that the court order only barred the state from executing Lee via nitrogen gas, but it did not restrict the state from using any other method legally available in Alabama (which consisted of both lethal injection and the electric chair) to carry out Lee's death sentence.

On July 28, 2026, U.S. district judge Emily C. Marks allowed the state to carry out the sentence of Lee by lethal injection, affirming that her order only barred the state from deploying nitrogen gas to execute Lee but did not exclude the use of other methods. Two days later, Lee's execution date was re-scheduled to take place on September 17, 2026.

On September 17, 2026, Lee was put to death by lethal injection in the Holman Correctional Facility. He was 49. Lee did not eat a special last meal before his execution. His last words were, "All is well. I just want to say to my family, I love them. To my brothers on life row, I love them."

== See also ==
- Capital punishment in Alabama
- List of people executed in Alabama
- List of people executed in the United States in 2026

Executions carried out in Alabama
Preceded by Jeremy Tremaine Williams August 13, 2026	Jeffery James Lee; September 17, 2026	Succeeded by Michael Shannon Taylor November 5, 2026
Executions carried out in the United States
Preceded by LeJames Norman – Texas September 16, 2026	Jeffery James Lee – Alabama; September 17, 2026	Succeeded by Ker'Sean Olajuwa Ramey – Texas September 23, 2026
