= Murder of Kamarie Holland =

2021 rape and murder of a young girl in Alabama

Kamarie Holland
- Born: November 23, 2016; Columbus, Georgia, U.S.
- Died: December 13, 2021 (aged 5); Phenix City, Alabama, U.S.
- Cause of death: Strangulation
- Resting place: Sunset Memorial Gardens
- Occupation: Pre-school student
- Known for: Victim.

Kamarie Holland (November 23, 2016 – December 13, 2021) was a five-year-old American girl residing in Columbus, Georgia, who was reported missing after being last seen at her home on December 13, 2021. That same night, Holland was found dead in an abandoned house in Phenix City, Alabama. Police investigation later led to the arrest of Jeremy Tremaine Williams (August 1, 1984 – August 13, 2026), who had previously lived in the house. Holland's mother, Kristy Marie Siple, (born June 22, 1986) was also arrested as a suspect after her involvement in her daughter's death was discovered.

It was revealed through investigation and during the trial that on the night of December 12, 2021, the day before Holland was reported missing, Siple agreed to allow Williams to rape her daughter. Williams, who filmed the sexual acts, then killed the girl by strangulation after raping and sodomizing her. Williams was found guilty of capital murder and rape and other charges and sentenced to death in April 2024; Siple, who had originally been charged with capital murder, pleaded guilty to sex trafficking and was sentenced to 20 years' imprisonment in July 2024.

In 2025, Williams petitioned to waive his right to appeal and asked to be executed. The appellate courts upheld his death sentence and found him mentally competent to forgo his appeals and be executed. On August 13, 2026, Williams was executed by lethal injection.

== Disappearance and murder ==
On December 13, 2021, a young girl residing in Columbus, Georgia, was found murdered in Phenix City, Alabama, which lies directly adjacent to Columbus across the state border.

On the night before her death, the 5-year-old girl, Kamarie Holland, was brought out of her home in Georgia and taken to the abandoned house of its 37-year-old former owner, Jeremy Tremaine Williams. Before this, Holland's mother, Kristy Marie Siple (alias Christie Hoskins), who had a sexual relationship with Williams, agreed to Williams's request to rape Holland. Siple allegedly asked Williams to pay her $2,500 in exchange for raping her daughter, but they reduced the payment to $1,300 after some negotiations, although Williams never paid Siple the reduced payment of $1,300.

After Holland was taken into Williams' vacant house, Williams raped the girl and also engaged in sodomy and oral sex; he also personally filmed the sexual acts and forced the girl to consume methamphetamine. After doing so, Williams used a ligature to strangle Holland and, therefore, killed her by asphyxiation. Even after Holland died, Williams went on to commit further sexual assaults on her corpse and similarly filmed the necrophilic acts.

Meanwhile, on the morning after the murder, Holland was reported missing by her mother, who lied to the police that she had last seen Holland before she went to sleep about midnight and awoke to find her daughter gone and the front door open. An extensive search was conducted, and on that night itself, Holland's body was found inside the same house where Williams had raped, sodomized, and murdered her. The police were able to identify Williams as the prime suspect and arrested him for the murder shortly after.

== Arrest and charges ==
After his arrest, 37-year-old Jeremy Williams was charged with capital murder of a child under the age of 14 years. He subsequently faced additional charges of capital murder during a kidnapping and capital murder during a rape; the offense of capital murder carries either life without parole or the death penalty under Alabama state law. Russell County Chief Deputy District Attorney Rick Chancey also said the prosecution would seek the death penalty, once further investigations were conducted in this case. It was further revealed that Williams had formerly been charged in a child abuse case. He was first charged in 2009 and acquitted by a jury in 2012.

On December 28, 2021, Siple was arrested as an alleged co-offender in her daughter's death. On December 29, 2021, a day after her arrest, 35-year-old Kristy Siple was charged with one count each of sex trafficking, felony murder during a kidnapping, felony murder during rape, and felony murder during sodomy. Before the revelation of her involvement in the rape-murder of Holland, Siple took part in an interview, and under the pretense of a mournful and heartbroken mother, she tearfully claimed that Holland had been the essence of her life, and could not process what happened to her.

In March 2022, a Russell County grand jury formally indicted both Williams and Siple for their respective charges of murder and other offenses pertaining to the rape and murder of Holland. Williams was indicted on eight charges, including four counts of capital murder for kidnapping, rape, and sodomy and for killing someone under the age of 14 years, as well as sex trafficking (two counts), producing child pornography, and abuse of a corpse. Siple was indicted on three counts of felony murder and two counts of sex trafficking.

Williams was also a suspect behind the alleged killing of his one-month-old daughter, Naudia Trenice Williams. The killing reportedly took place in January 2005 in North Pole, Alaska. During the original investigations, the North Pole Police Department found blunt force injuries but later ruled the manner of death as "undetermined" due to insufficient evidence and Williams's refusal to attend polygraph tests and police interviews. After his arrest for Holland's murder, the investigations in Naudia's death reopened, and hence, Williams was charged with second-degree murder; a Fairbanks grand jury formally indicted Williams for killing Naudia in December 2022. In relation to the case, police investigators and prosecutors from Russell County traveled to Alaska in July 2022 to assist Alaska authorities in the investigation of Naudia's killing.

On October 26, 2022, Williams was once again arraigned in court on fresh sexual abuse charges, which consisted of rape, sodomy, and sexual abuse of a child under the age of six, after Williams was found to be involved in another sexual assault case that had occurred in an undisclosed year.

Before his trial was set to commence, Williams filed a motion in December 2022, seeking to be removed from suicide watch, which he had experienced for nearly 10 months after prison authorities deemed that his behavior was suicidal from the outset (including one instance wherein Williams had tried to hang himself with some cloth), and it thus prompted them to place him under a modified form of suicide watch. A Russell County judge rejected Williams's request.

== Conviction of Kristy Siple ==
On March 13, 2024, Kristy Siple pleaded guilty to sex trafficking and faced a potential sentence of up to 20 years in prison for the charges she admitted to. Before making her plea agreement, the prosecution decided to drop the murder charge against Siple, which allowed her to no longer face the death penalty for murdering her daughter.

On July 18, 2024, Siple was sentenced to 20 years' imprisonment and a $10,000 fine. Siple, whose sentence was backdated to the starting date of her pre-trial imprisonment, was also required to register as a sex offender after her future release. Siple was additionally told to pay $100 to the Alabama Crime Victims Compensation Commission.

== Trial of Jeremy Williams ==
2021 booking photo of Jeremy Tremaine Williams

Prior to his trial for murdering Kamarie Holland, on March 13, 2024, Jeremy Williams pleaded guilty to multiple counts of capital murder, rape, and other offenses preferred against him in his upcoming trial. However, under Alabama law, Williams had to undergo a jury trial to determine his guilt before his potential conviction. When asked by the judge why he had pleaded guilty despite knowing the possibility of a death sentence, Williams replied that he only wanted to "expedite the process."

On April 8, 2024, Williams officially stood trial before a Russell County jury. Prosecutors affiliated with the Russell County District Attorney's Office were seeking the death penalty against Williams, and jury selection began on that same day. On the first day of trial, the jury were presented with video evidence of Williams's self-recorded acts of sodomy and rape committed against Holland, and it was revealed in court that Williams had chosen to confess due to his wanting to "get right with God" before he was, potentially, executed.

Forensic pathologist David Rydzewski, MD, testified in court that the cause of Holland's death was asphyxia due to ligature strangulation and that there was trauma in the girl's genitals, proving that Holland had been raped and strangled to death. Dr. Rydzewski also testified that toxicological reports and blood tests found traces of methamphetamine and amphetamine inside the girl's body system, suggesting that Holland had been drugged before her death.

On April 12, 2024, after a trial lasting three days, the jury found Williams guilty of a total of four counts of capital murder: mainly one of murder of a child younger than 14 years old, one of murder in the course of rape, one of murder in the course of kidnapping, and one of murder in the course of first-degree sodomy. Williams was also convicted of one count each of sodomy, sexual abuse of a child less than 12, production of obscene material involving a child, human trafficking, conspiracy to commit human trafficking and abuse of a corpse. In response to the guilty verdict, Holland's father stated that the judgment was "well deserved," and he urged the court to impose the death penalty. In a statement to the Columbus Ledger-Enquirer, Holland's father said, "Kamarie [Holland] was too precious for what happened to her."

On April 15, 2024, Russell County Circuit Court Judge David Johnson sentenced Williams to death on all four counts of capital murder. In addition, Williams was sentenced to life in prison for production of obscene material involving a child and human trafficking, 20 years' jail for conspiracy in human trafficking, and 10 years' jail for abuse of a corpse.

Prior to Williams's sentencing, the judge allowed the court to hear victim impact statements. Holland's father, who stated that Williams did not deserve to live, read aloud a letter from his elder daughter (Holland's sister) stating that her late younger sister was "sweet and caring." In another letter, Holland's grandmother lamented that her granddaughter would never have a prom, graduation, or wedding after her life was callously taken by Williams, whom Holland's grandmother condemned as an "immature, demonic, selfish, Godless person." Holland's first cousin also stated he had never met a child who smiled as much as Holland, and he reprimanded Williams for his conduct. Williams's ex-wife also took the stand to give a victim impact statement, condemning her ex-husband for being vile and evil enough to kill their one-month-old child and another family's daughter and constantly causing pain and suffering to defenseless people. A 23-year-old woman, who had been molested by Williams when she was four, also gave a victim impact statement, calling Williams a "monster."

== Williams's incarceration ==
After his 2024 sentencing, Williams was incarcerated on death row at the Holman Correctional Facility.

At the time of his sentencing, Williams became the 166th inmate newly added to Alabama's death row; the longest-serving death row inmate in Alabama was sentenced in January 1982.

On October 22, 2024, Jeremy Williams filed an appeal against his death sentence to the Russell County Circuit Court.

On May 15, 2025, a year after he was condemned to death row, Williams asked a Russell County Circuit Court judge to expedite his execution, expressing that he was willing to waive all his appeals and be executed as soon as possible. A hearing was set on May 23, 2025, to determine whether Williams was mentally competent to waive his appeals.

On May 23, 2025, Judge David Johnson agreed to Williams's request to waive his rights to appeal, finding that the appellant had the mental competency to make such a decision. The case was transferred to the Alabama Court of Criminal Appeals for further, mandatory review. Russell County Sheriff Heath Taylor, who believed that Williams was competent to be executed, offered his opinion that Williams likely did not want to spend about two decades on death row waiting for his execution and hence made this decision. Russell County District Attorney Rick Chancey also stated that Williams was truly evil and did not show remorse for his actions.

On March 28, 2026, the Alabama Court of Criminal Appeals upheld Williams's capital murder conviction and death sentence.

After the loss of his direct appeal, Williams once again expressed his wish to be executed as soon as possible. According to Russell County District Attorney Rick Chancey, the case would be transferred to the Alabama Supreme Court, which could authorize a death warrant, and based on its approval, Governor Kay Ivey could set an execution date for Williams, even though the process might take weeks, months, or years. Chancey also considered the possibility of Williams's changing his mind but stated that he would strive for quicker resolution to this case.

== Death warrant of Williams ==
On May 15, 2026, the Alabama Attorney General's Office filed a motion with the Alabama Supreme Court, seeking a death warrant to carry out Williams's death sentence.

On June 16, 2026, the Alabama Supreme Court authorized the death warrant of Williams, and the case was forwarded to Alabama governor Kay Ivey, who was tasked with scheduling an execution date for Williams.

Two days later, on June 18, 2026, Governor Ivey scheduled Williams's execution to take place by lethal injection on August 13, 2026, with a 30-hour window during which his death warrant would remain active. Williams's execution was the third in Alabama to be scheduled in 2026, but the state's first two executions were not carried out because Charles Lee Burton's death sentence had become commuted by the governor to life without parole two days before his March 2026 execution, and Jeffery Lee was granted a reprieve from his June 2026 execution after the federal courts barred the state from executing him via nitrogen hypoxia. Lee would later have his execution re-scheduled for September 17, 2026, with the method changed to lethal injection.

Prior to Williams's scheduled execution, Holland's father became charged with child endangerment for violating a custody order by allowing his daughter to go with her mother, Kristy Siple, who did not have custody at that time. Due to that pending charge, Holland's father was not allowed to witness the execution of Williams. In response, Holland's father stated that he should be given the chance to witness the execution of his daughter's killer and that denying him the opportunity to do so would be equivalent to denying him a moment to achieve closure. He also explained that he allowed the children to see their mother only because he wanted them to have the closest thing possible to a proper childhood, because he had been unaware that Siple was doing drugs, and because he never expected her to harm the children.

== Execution of Williams ==
On August 13, 2026, 42-year-old Jeremy Williams was put to death by lethal injection at 6:16 pm at Holman Correctional Facility. When asked whether he had a final statement, Williams stated, "I want to thank God for forgiving me for my sins so I can meet him in peace. Good night." For his final meal, Williams requested a cheese pizza. Williams is the first condemned person put to death in Alabama in 2026, as well as the first person in the United States to be executed for a murder occurring in the 2020s.

On the same day, Oklahoma executed Carlos Cuesta-Rodriguez for the shooting death of his common-law wife, Olimpia Fisher, and Tennessee executed Anthony Darrell Dugard Hines for the rape and stabbing murder of motel maid Catherine Jean Jenkins. Along with Williams's execution, this constitutes the first triple execution in the United States in 16 years. The last triple execution in the United States occurred on January 7, 2010, when Vernon Lamont Smith, Kenneth Mosley, and Gerald James Bordelon were executed in Ohio, Texas, and Louisiana respectively.

== Response and aftermath ==
Holland's funeral occurred on December 22, 2021. More than 200 family and friends attended the memorial service, and both Russell County Sheriff Heath Taylor and Russell County Chief Assistant District Attorney Rick Chancey also arrived to pay respects to Holland. Holland's great uncle described the tragedy in his own words: "Evil has entered our community. Evil has affected our family."

In April 2022, Holland's father stated that he was still processing what had befallen his daughter and that he felt that both Siple and Williams did not deserve to live for what they had done to Holland. He also stated that Siple had failed to protect her daughter and had breached the trust of all who had entrusted her with maternal duties.

On November 23, 2024, the date of Holland's eighth birthday, Holland's father held a party in remembrance of his daughter and celebrated her birthday. He stated in an interview a month later about his loss that losing Holland was like losing a piece of his heart.

== See also ==
- Capital punishment in Alabama
- List of people executed in Alabama
- List of people executed in the United States in 2026
- List of solved missing person cases (2020s)
- Volunteer (capital punishment)
- Murder of Shaniya Davis

Executions carried out in Alabama
Preceded by Anthony Todd Boyd October 23, 2025	Jeremy Tremaine Williams; August 13, 2026	Succeeded by Jeffery James Lee September 17, 2026
Executions carried out in the United States
Preceded by Anthony Darrell Dugard Hines – Tennessee August 13, 2026	Jeremy Tremaine Williams – Alabama; August 13, 2026	Succeeded by William Frances Silvia Jr. – Florida August 18, 2026
