= Raymond Eugene Johnson =

American serial killer (1974–2026)

- Johnson's 2023 mugshot
- Born: March 26, 1974; Oklahoma City, Oklahoma, U.S.
- Died: May 14, 2026 (aged 52); Oklahoma State Penitentiary, McAlester, Oklahoma, U.S.
- Status: Executed by lethal injection
- Convictions: First degree murder (2 counts); First degree manslaughter First degree arson
- Penalty: Death

Details
- Victims: 3
- Span of crimes: 1995–2007
- Country: United States
- State: Oklahoma
- Date apprehended: For the final time on June 24, 2007
- Imprisoned at: Oklahoma State Penitentiary, McAlester, Oklahoma

Raymond Eugene Johnson (March 26, 1974 – May 14, 2026) was an American convicted murderer who killed his ex-girlfriend and her infant daughter in Tulsa, Oklahoma, in 2007, shortly after being paroled from a previous manslaughter conviction in 1995. For the latter crimes, Johnson was sentenced to death, and was executed by lethal injection on May 14, 2026.

== First homicide ==
On September 11, 1995, the 21-year-old Johnson was in the company of 25-year-old Clarence Ray Oliver in Oklahoma City when the pair got into an argument. In the ensuing scuffle, Johnson pulled out a gun and threatened to shoot Oliver, who got into his car and attempted to drive away, and was then shot through the passenger side window. The car crashed into a nearby ditch, where it was found the following day.

About two weeks later, Johnson was questioned by detectives regarding the murder and was soon arrested for the murder. In the ensuing trial, he pleaded guilty to manslaughter and was sentenced to 20 years in prison.

== Release and double murder ==
After being paroled in 2005, Johnson moved to Tulsa, where he entered a relationship with a woman named Brooke Whitaker, a mother of four children. Their relationship quickly deteriorated as Johnson became physically abusive, stalked her, and even threatened to kill her on more than ten occasions. Due to this, she eventually filed a restraining order against him in April 2007, but the order was dropped the following month when neither party attended a court hearing scheduled for May 21.

On June 23, Johnson went to Whitaker's home, where he brutally beat her with a hammer, almost to the point of cracking her skull. He then doused her in gasoline, lit her on fire, and fled. Whitaker suffered severe burns, and her 7-month-old daughter, Kya, burned to death. Firefighters brought Whitaker to Hillcrest Medical Center, where she died of her injuries. Shortly after the discovery of the crime, an arrest warrant was issued for Johnson. He was arrested later that same day in Coweta and extradited to Tulsa, where he was charged with two counts of first-degree murder and one count of arson. According to the arrest report submitted by the Tulsa Police Department, Johnson admitted to both slayings.

== Trial and imprisonment ==
Jury selection for Johnson's trial took place in June 2009, with prosecutors announcing that they would seek the death penalty against him. Not long after, Johnson was found guilty on all counts and sentenced to death for each of the murder charges and to life imprisonment on the arson charge. He did not offer a statement after the verdict, and the verdict itself was welcomed by the victims' family members.

Following his incarceration on death row, all of Johnson's appeals were rejected by the respective courts. His final appeal was denied by the Supreme Court in November 2019, allowing for an execution date to be set.

== Execution ==
=== Execution warrants and clemency ===
On July 1, 2022, the Oklahoma Court of Criminal Appeals set execution dates for 25 state death row inmates, including Johnson. He was scheduled to be executed on May 2, 2024. His execution was later postponed due to a request by attorney general Gentner Drummond, who asked for 60 days between executions rather than 30 "to alleviate the burden on DOC personnel."

On February 12, 2026, just after the execution of Kendrick Simpson, Attorney General Drummond filed a new motion at the Oklahoma Court of Criminal Appeals requesting a second execution date for Johnson. The petition requested an execution date of May 14, 2026. On February 25, the Oklahoma Court of Criminal Appeals granted Drummond's request, setting May 14, 2026 as Johnson's execution date. On April 8, Johnson was unanimously denied clemency by the Oklahoma Pardon and Parole Board.

=== Lethal injection ===
On May 14, 2026, Johnson was executed by lethal injection and was pronounced dead at 10:12 a.m. CDT. Johnson's last meal consisted of chicken, a pint of gizzards, and fried pickles with hot sauce and ranch dressing. In his final statement, Johnson apologized to the victims family and asked for forgiveness stating he “hopes people can speak their names without his name attached to it”.

== See also ==
- Capital punishment in Oklahoma
- List of people executed in Oklahoma
- List of people executed in the United States in 2026

Executions carried out in Oklahoma
Preceded by Kendrick Antonio Simpson February 12, 2026	Raymond Eugene Johnson; May 14, 2026	Succeeded by Carlos Cuesta-Rodriguez August 13, 2026
Executions carried out in the United States
Preceded by James Garfield Broadnax – Texas April 30, 2026	Raymond Eugene Johnson – Oklahoma; May 14, 2026	Succeeded by Edward Lee Busby Jr. – Texas May 14, 2026
