= Murder of Jill Piper =

1976 child murder in Florida

- Piper in 1976
- Location: Bonita Springs, Florida, U.S.
- Date: August 13, 1976; 50 years ago
- Attack type: Shooting
- Weapon: Rifle
- Deaths: Jill Piper, 16
- Injuries: Terri Rice, 17; Richard Byrd Jr., 19
- Perpetrator: Harold Gene Lucas
- Verdict: Death (February 9, 1977) plus 60 years in prison

On August 13, 1976, 16-year-old Anthia Jill Piper was shot and killed by 24-year-old Harold Gene Lucas at her home in Bonita Springs, Florida, United States. Lucas, who was Piper's ex-boyfriend, killed Piper as revenge for breaking up with him. In addition to killing Piper, Lucas shot and wounded two of Piper's friends, Terri Rice and Richard Byrd Jr.

In February 1977, a court sentenced Lucas to death. He was executed by the state of Florida on September 1, 2026, after spending approximately 50 years in prison, the longest interval between conviction and execution in the United States.

== Background and crime ==
By the time of her murder, 16-year-old Jill Piper had been in an on-and-off relationship with Harold Gene Lucas, then aged 24. The relationship reached an end in August 1976, after months of deteriorating dynamics, including Lucas's substance dependence. He had been using drugs since the age of 17, beginning with smoking marijuana and consuming "all kinds of substances" by 1976, including LSD, cocaine, heroin, hashish, THC, and animal tranquilizers. After Piper decided to break up with him, Lucas began harassing her as well as threatening her with death, which had forced her to call the police and request the protection of her two friends, Terri Rice and Richard Byrd Jr., then aged 17 and 19, respectively.

On August 13, 1976, Lucas had been drinking and abusing drugs with his friends since the early evening. That same night he got into a fight at a gas station and was seen by relatives and other witnesses who described him to be "totally out of it" by 11:15 p.m. Around this time he drove to Piper's home in Bonita Springs. The girl had asked Rice and Byrd to stay with her for the night because she was scared of Lucas. Although they gave different accounts, Rice and Byrd testified about Lucas shooting them with a rifle. When he reached them inside the house, Lucas had already murdered Piper, who begged for her life and sustained defensive injuries during the assault. She was shot multiple times, with a gunshot to the head being a fatal wound. Lucas was arrested the following day by Lee County Sheriff Department officers.

== Trial and conviction ==
Harold Gene Lucas
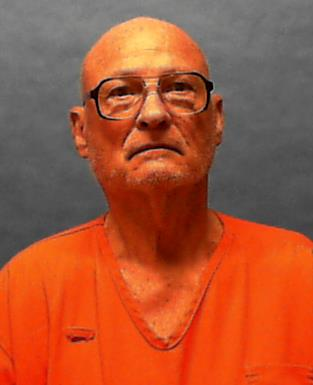
- Born: October 31, 1951; Arkansas U.S.
- Died: September 1, 2026 (age 74); Florida State Prison, Raiford, Florida, U.S.
- Status: Executed by lethal injection
- Convictions: First degree murder Attempted murder (2 counts)
- Penalty: Death

Details
- Victims: 1 killed, 2 injured
- Date: August 13, 1976
- Country: United States
- Location: Bonita Springs, Florida

Harold Gene Lucas (October 31, 1951 – September 1, 2026) was born into an extremely poor family of sharecroppers and grew up in Arkansas. He left school after completing the seventh grade. His father was an alcoholic who spent all the family's money on his addiction and beat his wife and children. Lucas was also psychologically abused by his father, who insulted him and frequently told him that he was worthless and "would never amount to anything."

After his arrest on August 14, 1976, Lucas was charged with the first-degree murder of Jill Piper and the first-degree attempted murder of Terri Rice and Richard Byrd Jr. He was first convicted on February 9, 1977, and sentenced to death for the killing, additionally receiving two sentences of 30 years in prison for the attempted murder charges, which were ordered to run consecutively to each other.

Between the first trial and the last trial in which he was sentenced to death, Lucas had his conviction vacated by the state's Supreme Court on numerous occasions due to procedural mistakes. In 1992, the Supreme Court of Florida reaffirmed a previous ruling and upheld Lucas's death sentence. The Supreme Court of the United States denied Lucas's appeal in 2003 and confirmed the verdict of the state. After 2003, Lucas filed many appeals to circuit courts, which were all denied. The state's supreme court rejected his last appeal (regarding a claim to Hurst v. Florida) in 2018.

On July 30, 2026, Governor Ron DeSantis signed Lucas's death warrant. The following day, July 31, during a hearing with the circuit court, Lucas declared that he wished to waive further proceedings, noting: "I am seventy-five years old. I've been on death row for fifty years and I have no desire to carry this any further. The sooner it's over, the better I'll enjoy it. I am tired. That's basically it." Judge Robert J. Branning of the 20th Circuit Court granted Lucas's request, and his execution would proceed unless the governor issued a stay of execution. A court subsequently set his execution date for September 1, 2026.

Piper's family was supportive of Lucas's execution. Her father has since died, while her mother lives in Alabama. Piper's siblings stated that they would take the woman, aged 86, to Florida to witness the execution.

The anti-death penalty organization Floridians for an Alternative to the Death Penalty launched a public petition requesting Governor DeSantis commute Lucas's death sentence to life imprisonment without the possibility of parole. A vigil by protesters opposing capital punishment was scheduled to begin on the eve of the execution in the premises of the Florida State Prison.

A spokesman for the Florida Department of Corrections (FDOC) told media on the morning of the execution day that Lucas had woken up at 5:45 a.m. and that he was visited by his sister. The official added that Lucas declined to meet with a spiritual advisor and that he was served his last meal of steak, French fries, biscuits, pie, ice cream and milk.

Lucas was executed by lethal injection on September 1, 2026, at the age of 74. When asked if he had a final statement, Lucas replied, "No". According to a spokesman of the FDOC, the procedure was carried out without complications.

== See also ==
- Capital punishment in Florida
- List of people executed in the United States in 2026
- List of people executed in Florida
- List of longest prison sentences served

Executions carried out in Florida
Preceded by William Frances Silvia Jr. August 18, 2026	Harold Gene Lucas; September 1, 2026	Succeeded by Daniel Owen Conahan Jr. September 10, 2026
Executions carried out in the United States
Preceded by William Frances Silvia Jr. – Florida August 18, 2026	Harold Gene Lucas – Florida; September 1, 2026	Succeeded by Daniel Owen Conahan Jr. – Florida September 10, 2026
