= Daniel Conahan =

American murderer, rapist and suspected serial killer (1954–2026)

- Conahan in 1996
- Born: Daniel Owen Conahan Jr. May 11, 1954; Charlotte, North Carolina, U.S.
- Died: September 10, 2026 (aged 72); Florida State Prison, Raiford, Florida, U.S.
- Occupation: Licensed practical nurse
- Status: Executed by lethal injection
- Convictions: First degree murder, Kidnapping
- Penalty: Death

Details
- Victims: 1–14+
- Span of crimes: 1993 (suspected) – 1996
- State: Florida
- Date apprehended: July 3, 1996

Daniel Owen Conahan Jr. (May 11, 1954 – September 10, 2026), dubbed the Hog Trail Killer, was an American convicted murderer, rapist and suspected serial killer. He was convicted of one murder, but has been linked to a dozen murders, mostly of transients seeking employment and gay men in the Charlotte County, Florida, area in what came to be known as the Hog Trail Murders. Conahan has also been named the prime suspect in the additional murders of eight men, collectively referred to as the Fort Myers Eight, who were discovered in a mass grave site in 2007. Conahan was executed by lethal injection on September 10, 2026, after spending nearly 27 years on death row.

== Early life and career ==
Conahan was born in Charlotte, North Carolina, on May 11, 1954, to a middle-class family and moved with his parents to Punta Gorda, Florida, shortly after his birth. When he was a teenager, he discovered he was homosexual; this displeased his parents, who sent him to several psychiatrists. Conahan frequently told friends that his sexuality was not a disease and how he was angered by having been mistreated and traumatized by his parents for his homosexuality. "It wasn't the kind of thing you were open about in the 1970s," Conahan later told investigators. "But I found a gay bar, and if I got there early, they wouldn't card me. Being gay is part of God's plan, too." He graduated Miami Norland High School in 1973 where classmates later described Conahan as a quiet loner, participating in school activities sporadically, and joined the United States Navy in 1977, and was stationed at Naval Station Great Lakes in Illinois for technical schooling.

In 1978, he was disciplined under the Uniform Code of Military Justice (UCMJ) for taking fellow Naval personnel off base for sex, and was discharged a few months later after getting into a fight with a man upon whom he had attempted to force oral sex. After his Navy discharge, Conahan stayed in Chicago for thirteen years before moving back to Punta Gorda to live with his elderly parents in 1993. In 1995, he became a licensed practical nurse, graduating at the top of his class from Charlotte Vocational-Technical Center, and was employed by Charlotte Regional Medical Center in Punta Gorda. Conahan spent the majority of his spare time frequenting gay bars. "I learned there are a lot of hitchhikers on U.S. 41 from North Port to Fort Myers, and some of them were looking to perform sex acts for money," he told detectives.

== Murders ==
=== Hog Trail Murders ===
Conahan was believed to be responsible for the Hog Trail Murders in Florida between 1993 and 1996. He was on death row for the murder of one of the victims, Richard Montgomery. While he was never brought to trial on the other killings, he is generally believed to have committed them. After Conahan's incarceration, several additional remains were discovered, and he was named a suspect in those deaths as well.

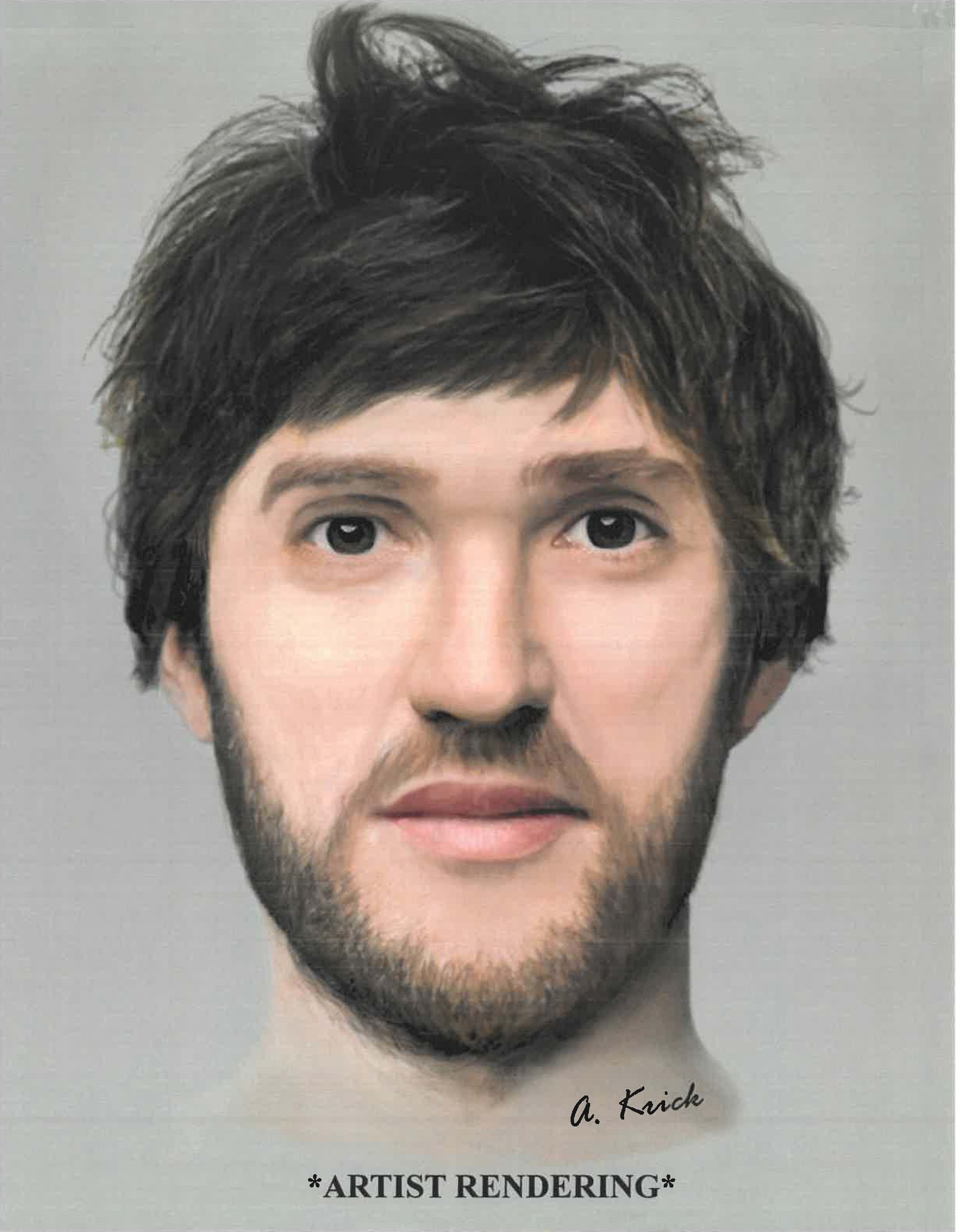
Facial reconstruction of previously unidentified victim, known as John Doe #1; DNA tests in 2021 identified victim as Gerald "Jerry" Lombard.

- On February 1, 1994, the mutilated corpse of a man was discovered in Port Charlotte, Florida, near Biscayne Boulevard by two hunters. The body had been outside for about a month and had rope burns on the skin and pelvic region. The genitalia had been removed and discarded. The man was not identified until June 2021, when the Charlotte County Sheriff's Office announced that new DNA testing done by Astrea Forensics confirmed the victim as 27-year-old Gerald "Jerry" Lombard, of Lowell, Massachusetts, who vanished from his home in Florida in 1991 and was described as a "drifter" by his family.
- On January 1, 1996, a North Port family's dog brought home a male human skull to a residence on Ferendina Street. The residents claimed that for months, their dog had been bringing them bones from the neighbourhood. Police eventually recovered the chest and hipbones a half mile from the residence after conducting a search a day later. More skeletal remains were discovered in an isolated wooded area, with just the right hand and chest covered in flesh. Despite the fact that the cause of death was undetermined, the medical examiner assumed the body had been severely mutilated, particularly around the genitalia. The North Port skeleton has not been identified and is referred to as the Sarasota County John Doe.
- On March 7, 1996, a man travelling down Route 75 in North Port, Florida, pulled off onto Laramie Circle to urinate. He came across a naked male corpse positioned face-up in the shape of a cross after passing the forest line. The man immediately contacted the North Port Police Department. The victim was killed, according to the medical examiner, ten days before he was discovered. He had four stab wounds and his genitals were mutilated. The victim's feet were covered in cuts and scrapes, and slash marks could be seen on his upper body, indicating that the victim may have tried to run away from his murderer moments before he was killed. It was assumed he was tied up before he was slain because of rope-marks on his body. Rope marks on a tree near the discovery of the bones was noted in one officer's report. The victim remained unidentified until June 30, 1999, when he was identified as 35-year-old William John "Bill" Melaragno.
- Another man's skull was discovered in Charlotte County, Florida, on April 17, 1996. Police searched the surrounding woods and found the rest of the man as well as a second body. The first body, which had been dismembered, was later identified as 25-year-old Kenneth Lee Smith. According to media reports, Smith's sister called police after seeing a photo on the news of a faint tattoo still visible on the unidentified man's shoulder. The second body was a man who had been raped, murdered, and mutilated only the day before, and was identified as 21-year-old Richard Allen Montgomery. Montgomery's mother informed police that a few weeks before her son's death, he told her he had met a new friend named 'Dan Conahan'. Speculation became rampant at this time about a serial killer, and the media dubbed the murders "The Hog Trail Killings", named for the wooded areas in which the bodies of the victims were found.
- While Conahan awaited trial, another skeleton was found in Port Charlotte, Florida, on May 22, 1997. A county construction worker was clearing brush on a dirt path when he discovered skeletal remains under a pepper tree near Quesada Avenue. The coroner determined the victim was deceased for several years. Ten months later, on March 16, 1998, DNA identified the remains as 24-year-old William "Billy" Charles Patten, who had disappeared in 1993.
- On October 19, 2000, skeletal remains were found in a wooded area west of Toledo Blade Boulevard in North Port, Florida. In January 2001, landscapers unearthed human bones on Grouper Hole Drive in Boca Grande, Florida. On November 28, 2001, during construction near U.S. 41 in Charlotte Harbor, Florida, construction crews discovered human remains, later determined to be male. On January 6, 2002, a man was discovered by county employees near a landfill site off Zemel Road in Punta Gorda, Florida. In July 2024, the remains were identified as belonging to 44-year-old Alejandro Narciso Lago, who was last seen in November 2001 in Miami and reported missing the following month. Investigators suspect that these discoveries might be tied to Conahan.

=== Fort Myers Eight ===
On March 23, 2007, eight skulls and skeletal remains were found in a wooded area in Fort Myers, the largest such discovery in Florida history. These came to be known as the Fort Myers Eight. In a forested area at Rockfill and Arcadia Streets, a property surveyor had initially found two human skulls. With the help of area agencies, cadaver dogs, and forensic experts, the Fort Myers Police Department was able to retrieve a total of eight sets of skeletal remains. They found no clothing nor remnants of coffins, body bags, or anything else that might be used to hold human remains. There were no tracks or other indications that someone had recently visited the area. Although a connection to a closed funeral home was considered possible, speculation soon turned to Conahan. The medical examiner has ruled the deaths to be homicides and Stanley Burden, the star witness at Conahan's trial, had been attacked within a mile of the site where the eight skeletons were found.

In November 2007, 38-year-old John Blevins was the first victim of the Fort Myers Eight to be identified. He had a transient lifestyle and lived in the Fort Myers area. He had a criminal record for minor offenses and was last seen in 1995, but was never reported missing. According to his mother, he mentioned plans to "go out" and to return shortly afterward. Shortly after Blevins' identification, a second victim was identified that same month as 21-year-old Erik David Kohler. Kohler disappeared from Port Charlotte, Florida, sometime during October 1995. In September 2008, Jonathan James Tihay, 24, was the third victim to be identified. He was a drifter who was last seen in October 1995 in Fort Myers, Florida, when he called his mother to ask for money. A victim who was formerly known as "Victim H" was identified in September 2022 as 30-year-old Robert Ronald "Bobbie" Soden of Fort Myers, Florida, who disappeared in 1996. Four of the deceased remain unidentified.

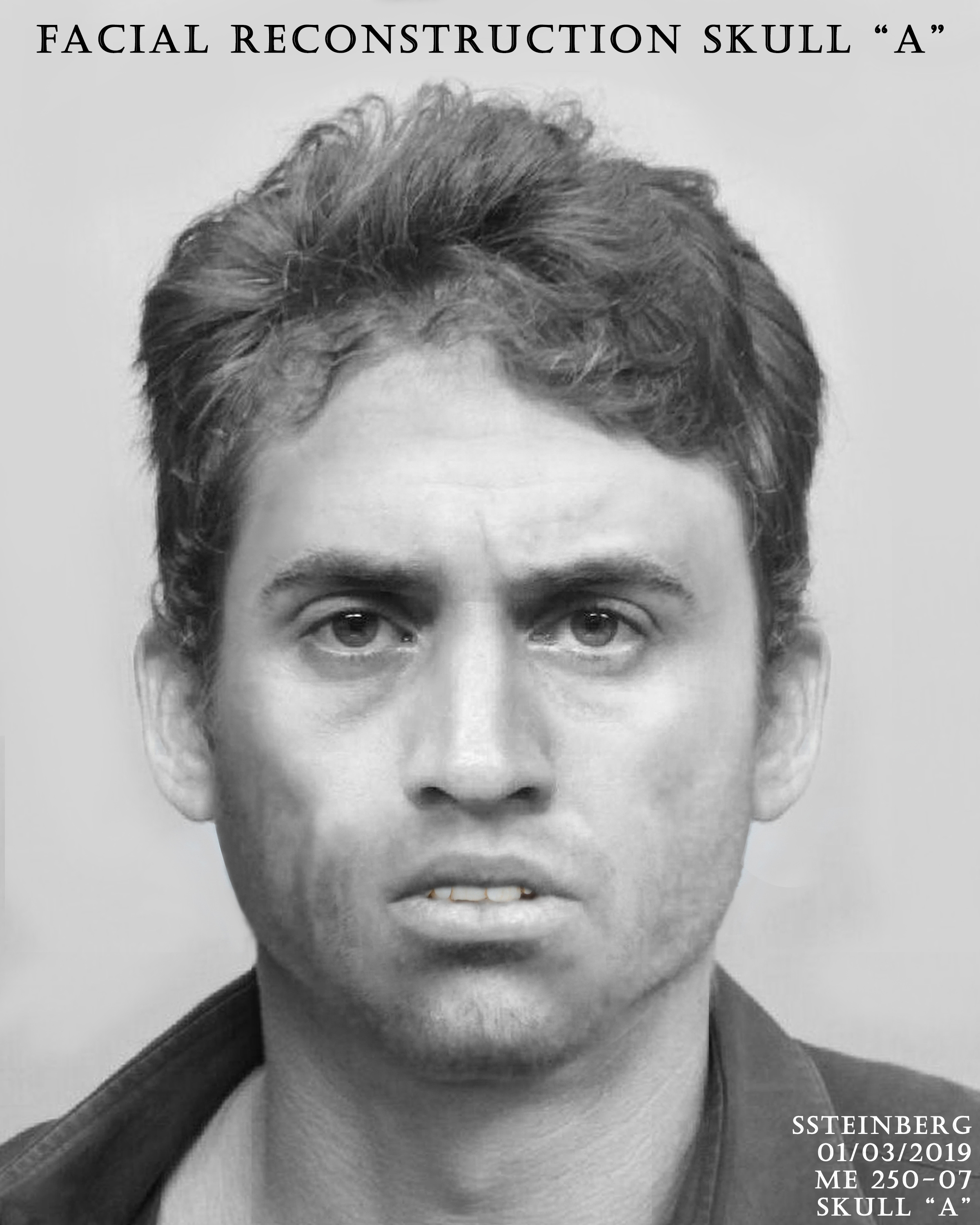
Facial reconstruction of victim "A"; Unidentified.

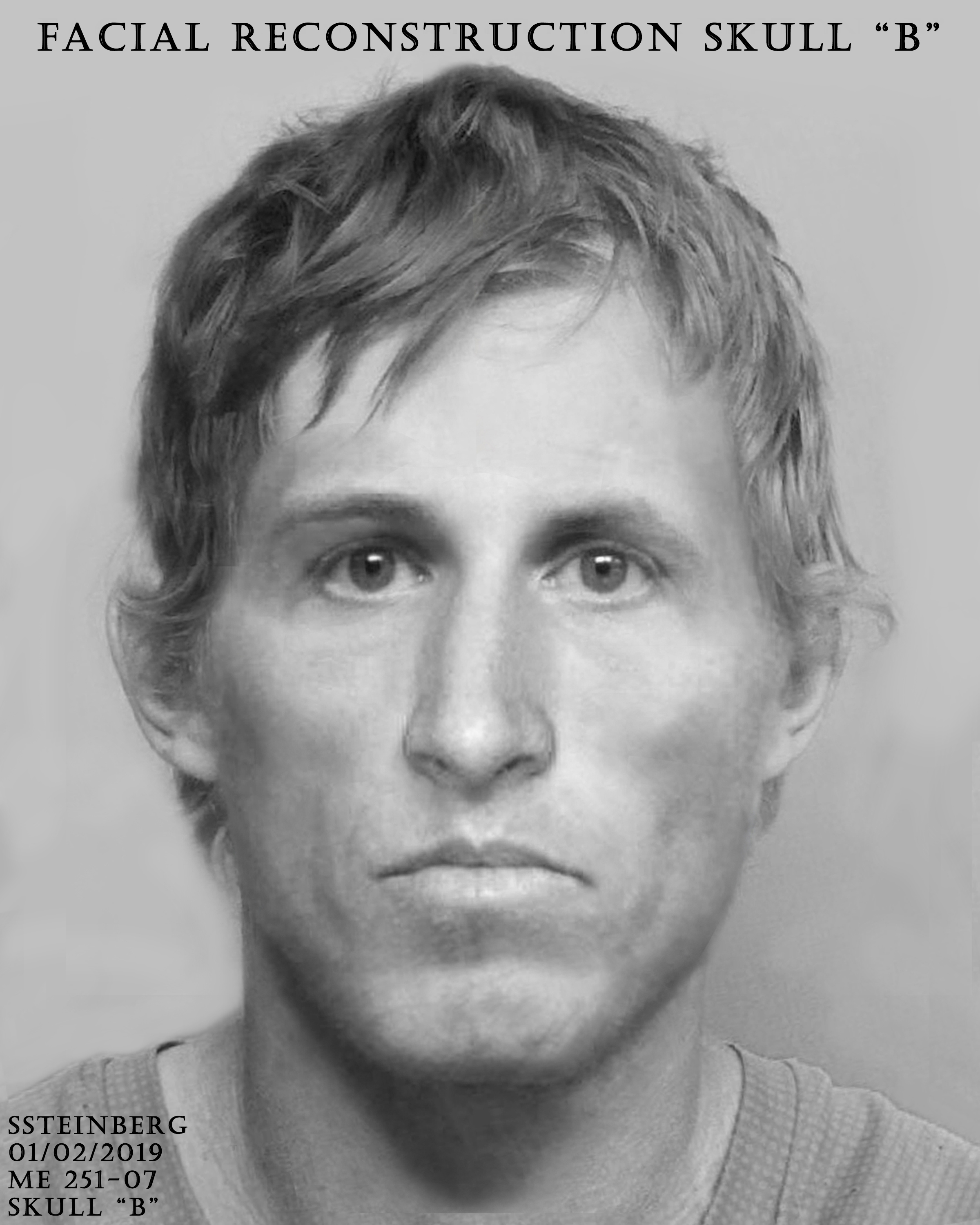
Facial reconstruction of victim "B"; Unidentified.

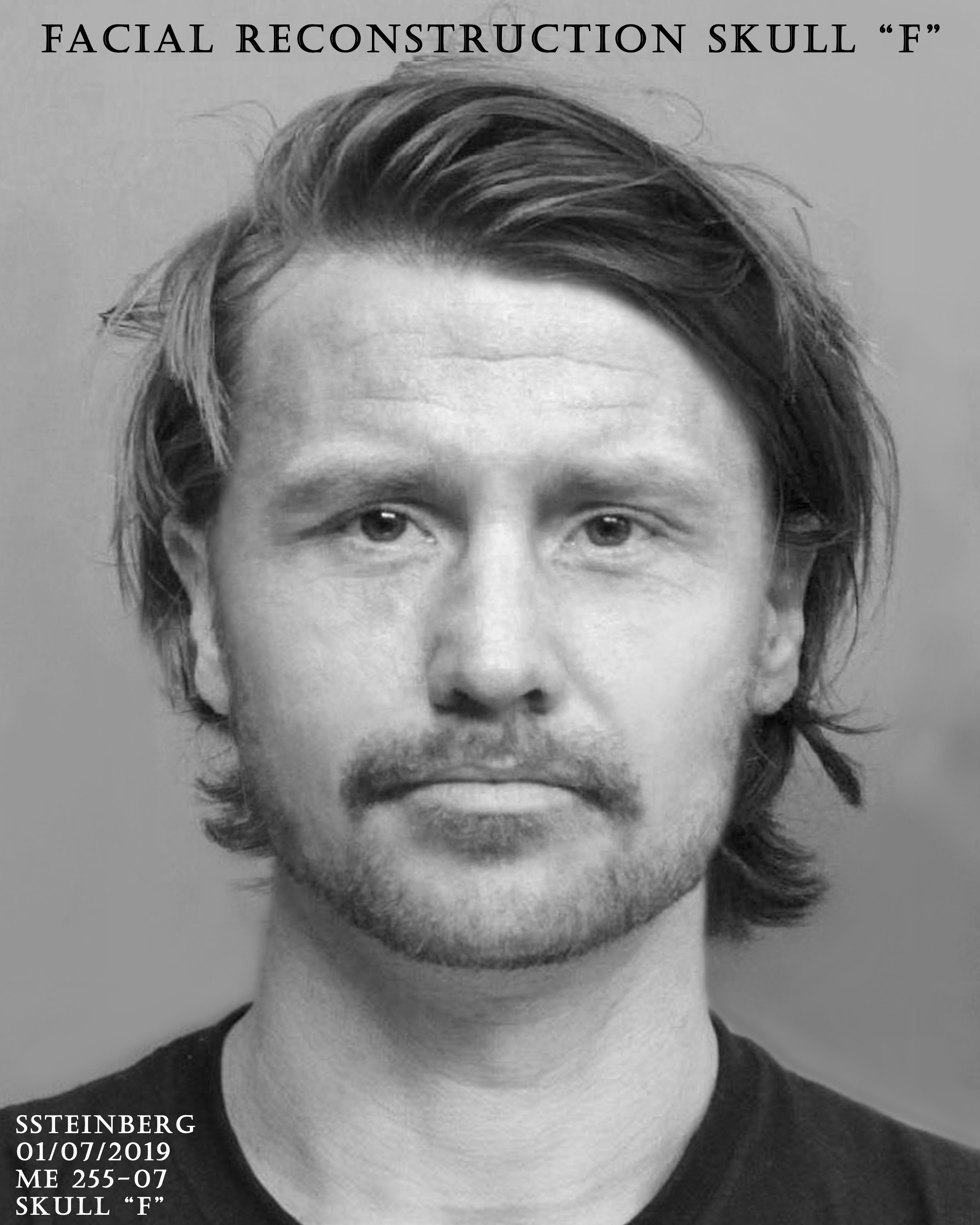
Facial reconstruction of victim "F"; Unidentified.

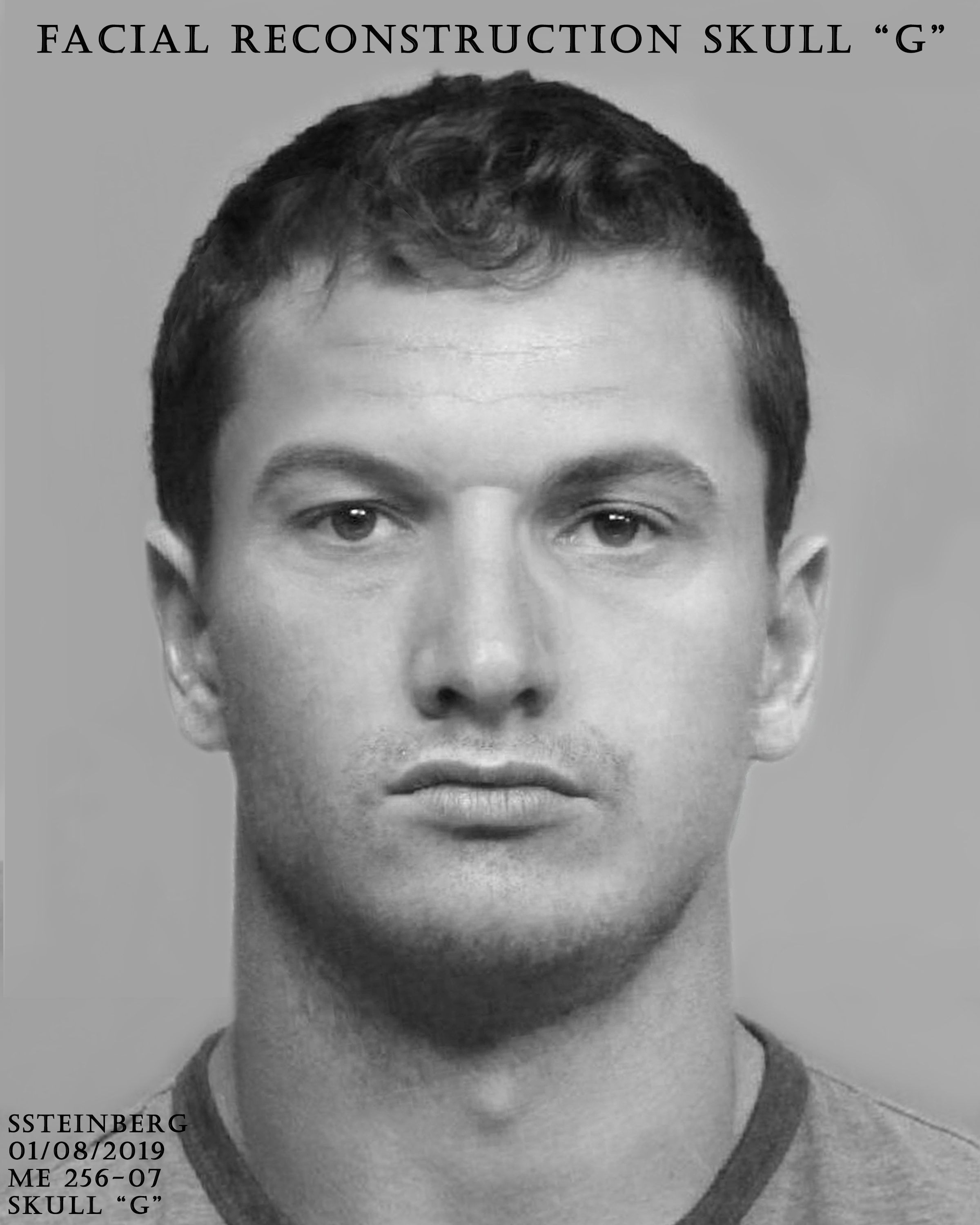
Facial reconstruction of victim "G"; Unidentified.

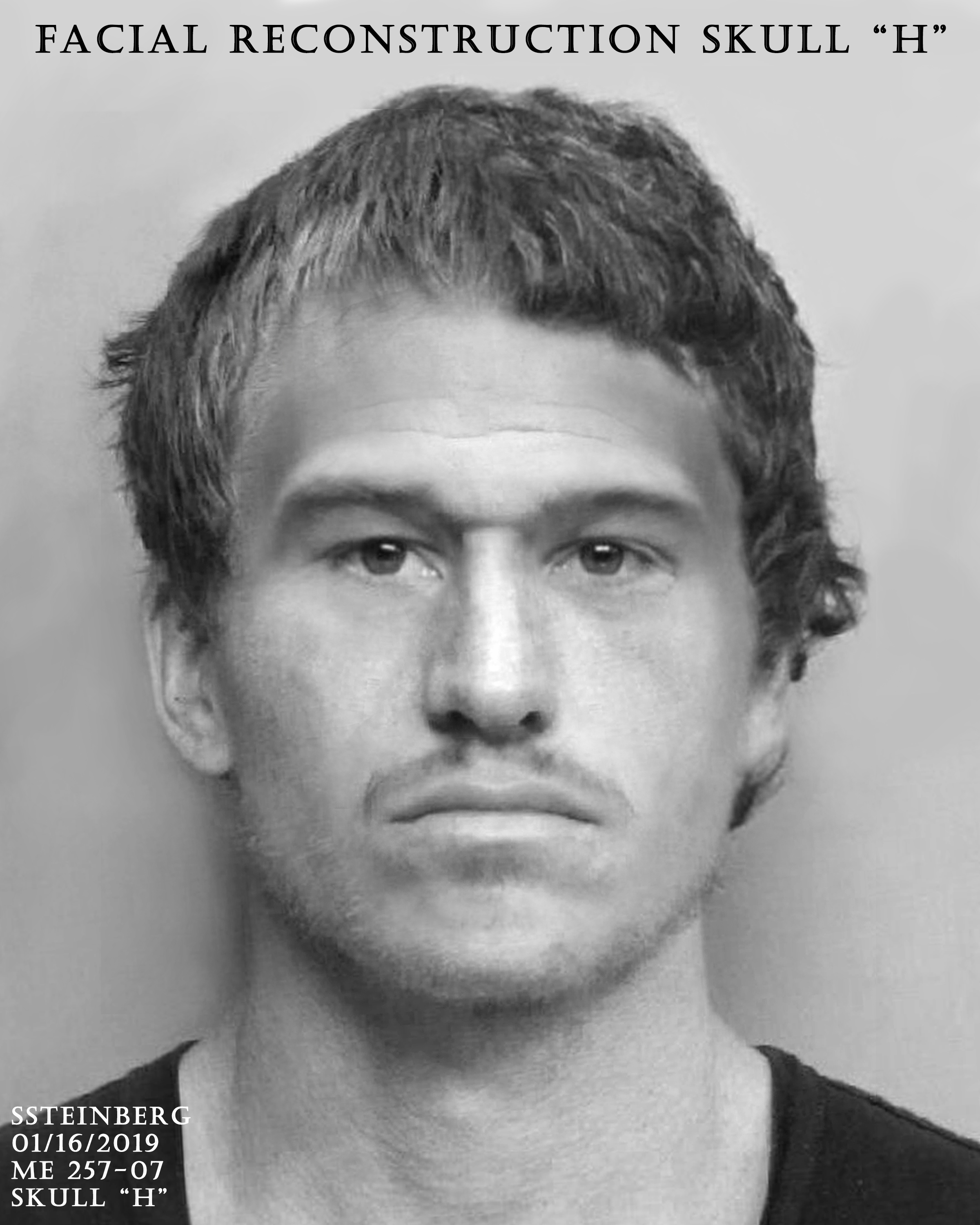
Facial reconstruction of victim "H"; Positively identified in September 2022, as 30-year-old Robert Ronald "Bobbie" Soden.

== Arrest and trial ==
In May 1996, several witnesses directed police to Daniel Conahan, including one who had escaped him when Conahan's car became stuck while driving him down a dirt road. Later, police linked Conahan to a 1994 Fort Myers police report where Stanley Burden had been propositioned, tied to a tree, and nearly strangled. Burden survived and had rope scars on his body two years later. Conahan's credit cards were subpoenaed and his house was searched, turning up evidence linking him to both Burden and Montgomery. On July 3, 1996, Conahan was arrested and brought to Lee County for the attempted murder of Burden. The following February, he was charged with the murder of Montgomery, while the attempted murder charges in the Burden case were dropped.

Conahan was tried for the 1996 kidnapping and murder of victim Richard Allen Montgomery. In Punta Gorda, he waived his right to a jury trial on August 9, 1999, thereby electing a bench trial. The star witness was Stanley Burden, who authorities alleged had been nearly killed by Conahan in 1994. Conahan's attorney rebutted that Burden was an imprisoned pedophile, serving a 10-to-25-year sentence in Ohio. On August 17, 1999, Judge William Blackwell deliberated for 25 minutes and found Conahan guilty of first-degree premeditated murder and kidnapping. Conahan succeeded in moving the penalty phase of his trial to Collier County but, in November, a jury recommended a sentence of death and Judge Blackwell agreed on December 10. Conahan was then transferred to death row at Union Correctional Institution in Raiford, Florida.

== Appeals and execution ==
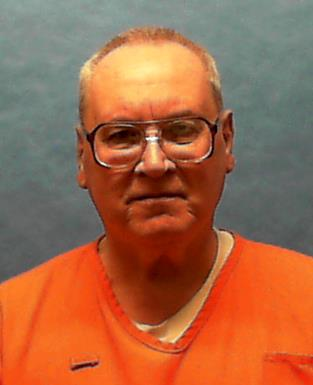
FDOC mugshot of Conahan

Following his 1999 death sentence, Conahan directly appealed his convictions for first-degree murder and kidnapping and his death sentence to the Florida Supreme Court. He raised five principal issues, including challenges to the sufficiency of the evidence supporting premeditated murder and kidnapping, the aggravating circumstances presented during the penalty phase, prosecutorial comments, and the admission of autopsy and crime-scene photographs. On January 16, 2003, the Florida Supreme Court rejected his claims and affirmed both convictions and sentences.

Conahan petitioned the U.S. Supreme Court for a writ of certiorari. The Supreme Court declined to review the Florida Supreme Court's judgment on October 6, 2003.

Conahan later sought postconviction relief under Florida Rule of Criminal Procedure 3.851. His operative postconviction motion contained twenty claims, several of which received an evidentiary hearing in June 2010. After the circuit court denied relief, Conahan appealed to the Florida Supreme Court in SC11-615 and also filed a petition for a writ of habeas corpus. His claims included allegations of ineffective assistance of trial counsel, Brady and Giglio violations, prosecutorial misconduct, ineffective assistance of appellate counsel, and challenges involving the admission of Williams-rule evidence. On March 21, 2013, the Florida Supreme Court affirmed the denial of his Rule 3.851 motion and denied his state habeas petition.

Conahan subsequently filed a successive Rule 3.851 motion based partly on newly discovered evidence. He relied on information concerning prosecution witness Stanley Burden and asserted related violations of Giglio v. United States and Brady v. Maryland. The circuit court denied relief and on February 17, 2017, the Florida Supreme Court affirmed the rejection of his newly discovered evidence and Brady/Giglio claims. Conahan sought rehearing, but the Florida Supreme Court denied rehearing on May 1, 2017.

Conahan then filed another successive Rule 3.851 motion challenging his death sentence under Hurst v. Florida and Hurst v. State. He also raised a related claim under Caldwell v. Mississippi and argued that changes to Florida's capital-sentencing statute should apply to his case. On October 19, 2018, the Florida Supreme Court held that Hurst applied retroactively to Conahan's case but concluded that the constitutional error was harmless beyond a reasonable doubt. The court emphasized that Conahan's penalty-phase jury had unanimously recommended a death sentence. It also rejected his Caldwell claim and his argument concerning the amended Florida statute. The denial of postconviction relief was therefore affirmed.

Conahan pursued federal habeas corpus relief in the U.S. District Court for the Middle District of Florida. On March 27, 2023, U.S. District Judge John E. Steele denied Conahan's amended petition and both supplements. The court also ruled that Conahan had not made the showing necessary for a certificate of appealability.

Conahan appealed the federal habeas judgment to the U.S. Court of Appeals for the Eleventh Circuit. His death-penalty appeal was docketed on March 14, 2024, and on April 4 he filed a motion seeking a certificate of appealability. On May 31, 2024, the Eleventh Circuit denied Conahan's application for a certificate of appealability, preventing him from obtaining full appellate review of the district court's rejection of his federal habeas claims. Conahan asked the Eleventh Circuit to reconsider its refusal to issue a certificate of appealability. On August 20, 2024, the Eleventh Circuit denied the request.

Conahan next sought U.S. Supreme Court review of the Eleventh Circuit proceedings. His petition was filed on December 18, 2024 and docketed on December 20. The Supreme Court distributed the petition for its February 21, 2025 conference and, on February 24, 2025, denied certiorari.

=== Death warrant ===
After exhausting multiple appeals, Conahan's death warrant was signed on August 11, 2026, by Florida governor Ron DeSantis, scheduling him to be executed on September 10, 2026. Following his death warrant, Conahan filed an appeal to the Florida Supreme Court to review Florida's Twentieth Judicial Circuit July 14, 2026, denial of Conahan's third successive motion to vacate his judgments of conviction and sentence. The Florida Supreme Court denied his appeal on August 14, 2026.

On September 8, 2026, Conahan appealed to the U.S. Supreme Court for a stay of execution, which was subsequently denied.

=== Execution ===
After being denied an execution stay by the Supreme Court, Conahan was executed by lethal injection on September 10, 2026, and was pronounced dead at 6:12 PM EST. For his last meal, Conahan requested chicken, a baked potato, corn, soda and pumpkin pie. He refused to make a final statement. Conahan was Florida's 15th execution in 2026.

== In media ==
The case was covered by many true crime television shows, such as: The New Detectives, Most Evil, Forensic Factor, Unknown Serial Killers of America and Buried in the Backyard.

== See also ==
- List of serial killers in the United States
- List of people executed in the United States in 2026
- List of people executed in Florida

Executions carried out in Florida
Preceded by Harold Gene Lucas September 1, 2026	Daniel Owen Conahan Jr. September 10, 2026	Succeeded by Curtis Wilkie Beasley Sr. September 29, 2026
Executions carried out in the United States
Preceded by Harold Gene Lucas – Florida September 1, 2026	Daniel Owen Conahan Jr. – Florida; September 10, 2026	Succeeded by LeJames Norman – Texas September 16, 2026
