= Murder of Shaniya Davis =

2009 abduction and murder of a young girl in North Carolina

Shaniya Davis
- Born: June 14, 2004
- Died: November 10, 2009 (aged 5); Sanford, North Carolina
- Cause of death: Asphyxiation
- Body discovered: Wooded area near Lee County–Harnett County border, North Carolina
- Parents: Bradley Lockhart (father); Antoinette Nicole Davis (mother)

On November 10, 2009, in Fayetteville, North Carolina, five-year-old Shaniya Davis (June 14, 2004 – November 10, 2009) was reported missing by her mother. Six days later, her body was discovered in a remote wooded area located in the boundaries of Lee and Harnett Counties.

Investigations led to the arrests of Shaniya Davis's mother Antoinette Nicole Davis and a 29-year-old man named Mario Andrette McNeill (born April 30, 1980), and it was revealed that Antoinette pimped Shaniya to McNeill in order to pay off her drug debt, and McNeill took the girl to a hotel, where he sexually assaulted Shaniya before he killed her. McNeill was found guilty of multiple crimes, including first-degree murder, first-degree kidnapping and sexual offence of a child, and sentenced to death on May 29, 2013, while Antoinette was sentenced to a minimum of 17 years' imprisonment for charges that include second-degree murder and human trafficking.

== Murder ==
On November 10, 2009, in Fayetteville, North Carolina, a five-year-old girl was reported missing, before she was found to be sexually assaulted and murdered in a hotel, after her mother pimped her out to her murderer.

Prior to her murder, five-year-old Shaniya Nicole Davis was pimped by her mother Antoinette Nicole Davis for $200 in order to pay off her drug debt. Shaniya Davis was rented by 29-year-old Mario Andrette McNeill, the former boyfriend of Antoinette's sister. On the night of November 10, 2009, McNeill took Shaniya away from her mobile home and later brought her to a hotel in Sanford, where he sexually assaulted her and murdered her by suffocating her. After he murdered her, McNeill dumped her body in a remote forested area.

Meanwhile, back at the mobile home, Antoinette alerted her sister (who was McNeill's ex-girlfriend) and the sister's live-in boyfriend that her daughter had gone missing. While Antoinette went outside to pretend to look for her daughter, Antoinette's son (Shaniya's brother) told his aunt and her boyfriend that McNeill had come to the home that night. Later on, Antoinette reported Shaniya missing to the Fayetteville Police Department, which issued an Amber alert and conducted a search for the missing girl. During the investigations, Antoinette initially denied having any idea about her daughter's disappearance, before she eventually admitted to the police in later interrogation sessions that she pimped her daughter to McNeill to discharge her drug debt. At one point, Antoinette also falsely accused her then-boyfriend, who was later cleared after the police investigated him.

McNeill later turned himself in and was arrested as the prime suspect after the police identified him with camera footage from the hotel, in which he was seen carrying Shaniya. During the probe into Shaniya's disappearance, McNeill originally denied knowing Shaniya and denied any involvement in her disappearance. Later, McNeill admitted that he indeed abducted Shaniya from her home and took her to the hotel, but he claimed Shaniya was still alive when he last left her alone somewhere. Not knowing that Shaniya was actually murdered by McNeill, the police continued their search for Shaniya with hope that she may still be alive. Six days after her kidnapping and murder, Shaniya's body was found lying partially underneath a log with deer carcasses in a wooded area near the Lee-Harnett county line, wearing only a T-shirt.

On November 17, 2009, a spokesperson for the North Carolina Office of the Chief Medical Examiner confirmed that the body discovered was that of Shaniya. Deputy Chief Medical Examiner Thomas Clark conducted the autopsy on the victim, and he certified that the cause of death was "external airway obstruction or asphyxiation", resulting from suffocation, as proven by a bruise on her cheek, likely left by a hand suffocating the girl. Abrasions on the vaginal area and absence of a hymen also confirmed that Shaniya was sexually assaulted by McNeill before her death.

On November 22, 2009, the funeral of Shaniya Davis took place, with more than 2,000 people attending her wake. It was reported that former basketball player Shaquille O'Neal generously paid for the funeral expenses out of sympathy for the victim.

== Charges ==
Originally, after his surrender and arrest, Mario McNeill was only charged with the kidnapping of Shaniya Davis, but after the death of Davis was confirmed through investigations, the authorities were looking at the possibility of charging McNeill with murder. Apart from McNeill, Davis's mother Antoinette Davis was charged with both human trafficking and felony child abuse for giving her daughter to McNeill for the purpose of prostitution. Antoinette was later released on bond in February 2010.

On November 19, 2009, McNeill was charged with both the murder and rape of Davis in the first degree.

On July 7, 2011, Antoinette was brought back to court, where she was charged with first-degree murder and indicted by a grand jury for the offence.

On October 6, 2011, the Cumberland County prosecutors announced that they would seek the death penalty against McNeill. Under North Carolina state law, the offence of first-degree murder warrants either the death penalty or life in prison without parole upon conviction. The death penalty was not sought against Antoinette.

On February 9, 2012, both McNeill and Antoinette pleaded not guilty to the murder of Davis.

On February 13, 2013, McNeill returned to court, where he faced additional charges of second-degree sexual exploitation of a minor and third-degree sexual exploitation of a minor.

== Trial of Mario Andrette McNeill ==
Mario Andrette McNeill
- Born: April 30, 1980 (age 46)
- Convictions: First-degree murder; First-degree kidnapping; Human trafficking (minor victim); Felony child abuse inflicting serious bodily injury; Felony child abuse by prostitution; Sexual offense of a child by an adult offender; Sexual servitude (minor victim); Taking indecent liberties with a child
- Criminal charges: First-degree murder; First-degree kidnapping; Human trafficking (minor victim); Felony child abuse inflicting serious bodily injury; Felony child abuse by prostitution; Rape of a child by an adult offender; Sexual offense of a child by an adult offender; Sexual servitude (minor victim); Taking indecent liberties with a child
- Penalty: For murder: death sentence; Other charges: 57 to 73 years in prison

Details
- Imprisoned at: Central Prison, Raleigh, North Carolina

Notes
- Also convicted of "assault resulting in serious bodily injury" (3 counts) in 2003

=== Jury selection and plea offer ===
In August 2012, the murder trial of Mario McNeill was scheduled to take place in February 2013. The date was later delayed and rescheduled to take place in April 2013. Prior to his trial, McNeill appealed to the court to bar the prosecution from seeking the death penalty, but the motion was denied in January 2013.

In early April 2013, when jury selection was ongoing before the start of McNeill's trial, the prosecution offered a plea deal to McNeill, stating that they would take the death penalty off the table if McNeill agreed to plead guilty to the murder of Davis and other charges related to the case. If McNeill accepted the plea, he would be sentenced to life imprisonment without the possibility of parole and avoid the death penalty. However, on April 9, 2013, McNeill protested his innocence and rejected the plea offer, and the trial was set to move forward with the resumption of jury selection.

On April 19, 2013, a 12-member jury was assembled to hear and try McNeill for the murder. However, the trial was delayed in order to allow McNeill to undergo psychiatric evaluation to determine if he was mentally fit to plead and claim trial. On April 26, 2013, McNeill was ruled mentally competent to stand trial for the murder of Davis.

=== Testimony ===
During the trial, a hotel front desk clerk testified that she had seen McNeill on the day of Davis's murder, and McNeill reportedly told her that his daughter was with him and he was to bring the girl back to her mother in Virginia. The witness testified that she saw a texture of the girl's hair when she again saw McNeill, this time carrying a girl wrapped in a blanket, and when she saw the Amber Alert issued for Davis the next day at the end of her shift, she noticed the hair texture of the girl from the previous night resembled Davis's, and she therefore called the Amber Alert hotline. Another witness, a man who stayed at the hotel, also testified to seeing McNeill carrying a girl when he walked past McNeill in the hallway.

Aside from this, the prosecution also presented evidence that further connected McNeill to the crime, even though McNeill insisted he never killed Davis. There were traces of soil found on the gas pedal of McNeill's vehicle, and tests made on the soil showed that they were consistent with the soil from the area where McNeill disposed of the girl's corpse. There were pieces of pubic hair found on a blanket dumped outside the home of Shaniya, as well as four pieces of body hair found in the hotel room where McNeill checked in, and these hairs were matched to McNeill. Forensic experts also testified that none of McNeill's DNA were found on the body, likely due to either the contamination and exposure from soil elements and bacteria or the absence of rape in spite of the girl's sexual injuries.

Several police officers were also summoned to court to testify as well, especially the officers present at the scene where Davis's body was found. According to one of the officers, the vegetation was so overgrown that the authorities had to cut the vines to get the corpse out, but they were entangled to the point that some of the vines were left on the body to avoid destroying potential evidence before the autopsy. A 14-minute video recording the recovery of the body from the area was also presented to the jury and spectators present in the courtroom.

=== Conviction and sentence ===
On May 24, 2013, after deliberating the case for 7 1/2 hours, the jury found McNeill guilty of first-degree murder, first-degree kidnapping, sexual offense of a child, indecent liberties with a child, human trafficking and sexual servitude. However, McNeill was acquitted of the seventh count of child rape by the same jury.

On May 28, 2013, McNeill's sentencing trial began before the same jury, who were tasked with deciding between the sentence of life without parole or the death penalty for McNeill on the most serious charge of first-degree murder. During the hearing, McNeill reportedly refused to let his family members testify for him on his behalf and declined to present arguments against the death sentence. Davis's father and 21-year-old elder half-sister came to court to testify about the emotional impact of Davis's murder on their lives.

On May 29, 2013, McNeill was sentenced to death by Superior Court Judge Jim Ammons upon the jury's unanimous recommendation for capital punishment. Reports showed that McNeill was emotionless in court when the death sentence was passed that same day. McNeill was the first person to be sentenced to death in Cumberland County in six years, and he became the 153rd inmate on North Carolina's death row.

== Trial of Antoinette Davis ==
Antoinette Nicole Davis
- Born: July 3, 1984 (age 42)
- Convictions: Second-degree murder; First-degree kidnapping; Human trafficking; Felony child abuse with prostitution; Felony child abuse involving a sex act; Conspiracy to commit sexual offence of a child by an adult offender; First-degree sexual offence; Sexual servitude; Taking indecent liberties with a child
- Criminal charges: First-degree murder; First-degree kidnapping; Human trafficking; Felony child abuse with prostitution; Felony child abuse involving a sex act; Conspiracy to commit sexual offence of a child by an adult offender; Rape of a child by an adult offender; Sexual servitude; Taking indecent liberties with a child
- Penalty: 210 to 261 months (17½ to 21¾ years) in prison

Details
- Imprisoned at: Western Correctional Center for Women, Black Mountain, North Carolina

On July 12, 2013, the trial of Antoinette Davis was scheduled to begin on October 14, 2013. In September 2013, the trial date was postponed by two weeks until October 28, 2013.

On October 19, 2013, Antoinette reached a plea agreement with the prosecution, and she submitted an Alford plea for charges of second-degree murder, human trafficking, first-degree kidnapping, first-degree sex offense, felony child abuse with prostitution, child abuse involving a sex act, sexual servitude, indecent liberties with a child and conspiracy to commit sex offense of a child. The prosecution chose to reduce the original charge of first-degree murder after reviewing the trial evidence, and they believed there were insufficient grounds to prosecute her for the original charge.

After Antoinette's conviction, Superior Court Judge Jim Ammons sentenced her to 17 1/2 to 21 years in prison. During sentencing, Judge Ammons remarked that Antoinette was not a good mother and pointed out that she had the opportunity and means to avert her actions and save her daughter's life, but she did not do so and therefore Davis died of a murder. Davis's father stated that he had forgiven Antoinette.

On October 21, 2014, the North Carolina Court of Appeals dismissed the appeal of Antoinette against her convictions for the murder of her daughter.

== McNeill's appeals and death row ==
After his sentencing, Mario McNeill was transferred to the Central Prison, where he was held in solitary confinement at death row. An October 2013 report revealed that McNeill was classified as "intensive control status" and for security reasons, he was kept in his one-man cell for 23 hours a day and only allowed to come out for a shower and brief recreation activities, but he had limited interaction with other prisoners.

On December 30, 2016, McNeill filed an appeal to the North Carolina Supreme Court, seeking to overturn his death sentence and murder conviction, and asked to receive a new trial for the crime. The case was forwarded for hearing before the North Carolina Supreme Court.

On June 8, 2018, the North Carolina Supreme Court dismissed the appeal of McNeill and affirmed his death sentence and conviction.

== Aftermath ==
The murder of Shaniya Davis was classified as one of the most infamous crimes to happen in Fayetteville, North Carolina.

After the murder of his daughter, Davis's father Bradley Lockheart moved to Alabama. In June 2010, he conducted a community event titled "Shaniya Speaks Day" to honor her, and also to raise awareness about child sex crimes and violence against children. In November 2010, one year after the murder of Davis, a memorial was conducted with family and friends attending the event to commemorate the victim.

Within four years after the murder of Shaniya Davis, the state of North Carolina passed a law titled "Shaniya's Law", named after the victim. The law criminalize the act of selling, buying, or trading a child as part of preventing human trafficking and child exploitation. The law took effect in December 2012, and William Jerry Faulkner became the first to be charged under the law for soliciting a person to sell him an autistic child for inappropriate sexual behavior.

Eight years after Davis's murder, in May 2017, her 20-year-old half-brother Chavez Christian Lockhart was murdered in a shooting at Raeford, North Carolina. Two male suspects, aged 18 and 17, were arrested by September 2017 for the killing.

In December 2017, a state review report was released regarding the Shaniya Davis murder case. The report concluded that Davis was a victim of abuse before her murder, and revealed that there were several flaws committed by the authorities that indirectly led to the failure to uncover the abuse and in turn led to the crime. One of the highlighted points include the failure of the Cumberland County school officials to notify the Department of Social Services about their concerns over the circumstances of Davis' family. Another point was the Cumberland County social workers being uninformed about a drug raid made on the home of Davis and her family a few months before her death.

== See also ==
- List of murdered American children
- Capital punishment in North Carolina
- List of death row inmates in the United States § North Carolina
- List of solved missing person cases (2000s)
- Murder of Kamarie Holland
