= List of people executed in the United States in 2026 =

To date, thirty-nine people, all male, have been executed in the United States in 2026, all by lethal injection.

Harold Gene Lucas, one of Florida's longest-serving prisoners on death row, was executed nearly 50 years after he was convicted of the 1976 murder of his 16-year-old ex-girlfriend Jill Piper.

James Aren Duckett and Dominick Anthony Occhicone were executed five hours apart on the same date of July 28, 2026. (Note: Duckett, a former police officer, was found guilty of the 1987 kidnapping, rape and murder of 11-year-old Teresa Mae McAbee while Occhicone was convicted of the 1986 murders of his former girlfriend's parents, Raymond and Martha Artzner.) This was the first double execution carried out in a single day in a U.S. death penalty state since Arkansas executed Jack Harold Jones and Marcel Wayne Williams in 2017 and the first in Florida since 1964. At the same time, Occhicone became the oldest person to be executed in Florida at the age of 80.

Charles Lee Burton was originally scheduled to be executed in Alabama by nitrogen hypoxia on March 12, 2026. His death sentence was commuted to life without parole by Governor Kay Ivey just two days before his scheduled execution.

Tony Von Carruthers, who was originally scheduled to be executed in Tennessee on May 21, 2026, received a one-year reprieve from Governor Bill Lee after complications with setting IV lines prior to the execution. Another Tennessee inmate, Christa Gail Pike, was originally scheduled to be executed on September 30, 2026, failed to be executed after surviving two lethal injection attempts. As a result, the December 3, 2026 scheduled execution of Gary Wayne Sutton was put on hold.

Jeffery James Lee received a stay of his June 11, 2026, execution date after Lee succeeded in his lawsuit against nitrogen hypoxia, a secondary method of execution in Alabama that is available upon the request of the inmate. Attorney General Steve Marshall sought a new death warrant shortly thereafter that specified lethal injection, Alabama's primary method of execution, instead of nitrogen hypoxia. Lee was ultimately executed on September 17, 2026.

Carlos Cuesta‑Rodriguez, Anthony Darrell Dugard Hines, and Jeremy Tremaine Williams were executed in Oklahoma, Tennessee and Alabama respectively on August 13, 2026 in the first triple execution since 2010. A second triple execution was carried out on November 5, 2026, when Jeffrey Allen Weisheit, Jesse Guardado and Michael Shannon Taylor were put to death in Indiana, Florida and Alabama respectively.

Thomas Mitchell Overton was the 20th person to be executed in the state of Florida in 2026, breaking the previous year's record for the most executions conducted in Florida in a single year.

== List of people executed in the United States in 2026 ==
No.	Date of execution	Name	Age of person			Gender	Ethnicity	State	Method	Ref.
No.	Date of execution	Name	At execution	At offense	Age difference	Gender	Ethnicity	State	Method	Ref.
1	January 28, 2026	Charles Victor Thompson	55	27	28	Male	White	Texas	Lethal injection	
2	February 10, 2026	Ronald Palmer Heath	64	27	37	Male	White	Florida	Lethal injection	
3	February 12, 2026	Kendrick Antonio Simpson	45	25	20	Male	Black	Oklahoma	Lethal injection	
4	February 24, 2026	Melvin Lee Trotter	65	25	40	Male	Black	Florida	Lethal injection	
5	March 3, 2026	Billy Leon Kearse	53	18	35	Male	Black	Florida	Lethal injection	
6	March 11, 2026	Cedric Allen Ricks	51	38	13	Male	Black	Texas	Lethal injection	
7	March 17, 2026	Michael Lee King	54	36	18	Male	White	Florida	Lethal injection	
8	April 21, 2026	Chadwick Scott Willacy	58	22	36	Male	Black	Florida	Lethal injection	
9	April 30, 2026	James Ernest Hitchcock	70	20	50	Male	White	Florida	Lethal injection	
10	April 30, 2026	James Garfield Broadnax	37	19	18	Male	Black	Texas	Lethal injection	
11	May 14, 2026	Raymond Eugene Johnson	52	33	19	Male	Black	Oklahoma	Lethal injection	
12	May 14, 2026	Edward Lee Busby Jr.	53	31	22	Male	Black	Texas	Lethal injection	
13	May 20, 2026	Leroy Dean McGill	63	39	24	Male	White	Arizona	Lethal injection	
14	May 21, 2026	Richard Andrew Knight Jr.	47	21	26	Male	Black	Florida	Lethal injection	
15	June 2, 2026	Andrew Richard Lukehart	53	22	31	Male	White	Florida	Lethal injection	
16	June 25, 2026	Dusty Ray Spencer	74	39	35	Male	White	Florida	Lethal injection	
17	July 14, 2026	Dennis Michael Sochor	74	29	45	Male	White	Florida	Lethal injection	
18	July 28, 2026	James Aren Duckett	68	29	39	Male	White	Florida	Lethal injection	
19	July 28, 2026	Dominick Anthony Occhicone Jr.	80	40	40	Male	White	Florida	Lethal injection	
20	August 13, 2026	Carlos Cuesta-Rodriguez	70	47	23	Male	Hispanic	Oklahoma	Lethal injection	
21	August 13, 2026	Anthony Darrell Dugard Hines	66	24	42	Male	White	Tennessee	Lethal injection	
22	August 13, 2026	Jeremy Tremaine Williams	42	37	5	Male	Black	Alabama	Lethal injection	
23	August 18, 2026	William Frances Silvia Jr.	61	41	20	Male	White	Florida	Lethal injection	
24	September 1, 2026	Harold Gene Lucas	74	24	50	Male	White	Florida	Lethal injection	
25	September 10, 2026	Daniel Owen Conahan Jr.	72	41	31	Male	White	Florida	Lethal injection	
26	September 16, 2026	LeJames Norman	40	19	21	Male	Black	Texas	Lethal injection	
27	September 17, 2026	Jeffery James Lee	49	21	28	Male	Black	Alabama	Lethal injection	
28	September 23, 2026	Ker'Sean Olajuwa Ramey	41	20	21	Male	Black	Texas	Lethal injection	
29	September 29, 2026	Curtis Wilkie Beasley Sr.	77	46	31	Male	White	Florida	Lethal injection	
30	October 7, 2026	Jamaal Howard	46	20	26	Male	Black	Texas	Lethal injection	
31	October 13, 2026	James Robertson	63	45	18	Male	White	Florida	Lethal injection	
32	October 20, 2026	William Reaves Jr.	77	37	40	Male	Black	Florida	Lethal injection	
33	November 5, 2026	Jeffrey Allen Weisheit	50	34	16	Male	White	Indiana	Lethal injection	
34	November 5, 2026	Jesse Guardado	64	42	22	Male	White	Florida	Lethal injection	
35	November 5, 2026	Michael Shannon Taylor	54	19	35	Male	White	Alabama	Lethal injection	
36	November 12, 2026	James Dwight Pavatt	73	48	25	Male	White	Oklahoma	Lethal injection	
37	November 12, 2026	John Allen Rubio	46	22	24	Male	Hispanic	Texas	Lethal injection	
38	November 19, 2026	Thomas Mitchell Overton	71	35	36	Male	White	Florida	Lethal injection	
39	November 19, 2026	Reinaldo Dennes	70	39	31	Male	Hispanic	Texas	Lethal injection	
		Average:	60 years	31 years	29 years					

== Demographics ==
Gender
Male	39	100%
Female	0	0%
Ethnicity
White	21	54%
Black	15	38%
Hispanic	3	8%
State
Florida	20	51%
Texas	9	23%
Oklahoma	4	10%
Alabama	3	8%
Arizona	1	3%
Indiana	1	3%
Tennessee	1	3%
Method
Lethal injection	39	100%
Month
January	1	3%
February	3	8%
March	3	8%
April	3	8%
May	4	11%
June	2	5%
July	3	8%
August	4	11%
September	6	16%
October	3	8%
November	7	16%
December	0	0%
Age
30–39	1	3%
40–49	8	21%
50–59	10	26%
60–69	8	16%
70–79	12	29%
80–89	1	3%
Total	39	100%

== Executions in recent years ==
Number of executions
2027	—
2026	39
2025	47
Total	86

== See also ==
- List of death row inmates in the United States
- List of most recent executions by jurisdiction
- List of people scheduled to be executed in the United States

Preceded by 2025	List of people executed in the United States in 2026	Succeeded by 2027
