= Murders of Michael and Missy MacIvor =

1991 murders of a couple in the Florida Keys

- Michael and Missy MacIvor
- Location: Tavernier, Florida, US
- Date: August 22, 1991
- Attack type: Murder and rape
- Deaths: Michael MacIvor, 30; Susan "Missy" MacIvor, 29
- Perpetrator: Thomas Mitchell Overton
- Verdict: Guilty on all counts
- Convictions: First-degree murder Killing an unborn child Burglary; Sexual battery
- Sentence: Death

On August 22, 1991, in their home in Tavernier, Florida, United States, Michael and Susan "Missy" MacIvor were attacked by Thomas Mitchell Overton, who killed the couple and additionally raped Missy before murdering her. At the time of her death, Missy was eight months pregnant with the couple's child, and the unborn baby also died as a result.

Overton was not caught until five years later, when the police arrested him for an unrelated robbery case. Overton was additionally linked to the double murder through DNA testing that matched his profile to the semen found at the crime scene. Overton was found guilty of the double murder and sentenced to death in 1999, and he was executed on November 19, 2026.

== Murders ==
On August 22, 1991, a married couple were found murdered inside their home in Tavernier, Florida. The female victim was eight months pregnant at the time of her death and her unborn child died as a result.

The couple were Michael MacIvor, a 30-year-old pilot and aircraft parts dealer, and Susan "Missy" MacIvor, his 29-year-old wife who was employed as a schoolteacher. They were last seen alive on August 21, 1991, the night before the crime, when they attended their childbirth class. Michael had resided in Tavernier since 1989. He met Missy in 1987 and they married in 1990. Later that year, Michael became an aircraft inspector. He was 29 years old. Missy was a graduate of Florida International University. She taught third-graders at Key Largo Elementary School. Her father was a Miami business executive. About 15 months after they married, Missy became pregnant with their son who they decided to name Kyle Patrick.

On August 22, Missy failed to report for work. School authorities called the couple's neighbors, and out of concern for the couple's welfare, co-workers and a neighbor arrived at the MacIvors' house near TavernAero Airport, a private airstrip. After gaining entry into the house, they discovered Michael and Missy's bodies. Michael was found in the living room. He had been bludgeoned in the head and strangled with a tie. His head was covered with masking tape with only his nose partially exposed and a sock was covering his eyes. Missy's body was completely naked and on top of a white comforter in the master bedroom. She was hogtied with belts and strangled with a tie. Her mouth and eyes were also covered. Autopsy reports showed that Missy was raped by her attacker(s) before her death. The couple's unborn son also died as a result of his mother's death, and a medical examiner stated that the child was likely alive for approximately thirty minutes before dying.

For the next five years, the murders remained unsolved. During the early stages of investigation, the police suspected that the double murder was linked to a drug cartel. They suspected that because Michael frequently flew between the United States and Central America and, a short time before his murder, he had returned from Belize with a twin-engine plane, which he bought from the local government with a price of $30,000. Michael's brother was considered a person of interest until DNA tests cleared him of any involvement in the case. The drug cartel theory was eventually abandoned after investigations failed to find evidence to support it.

== Charges ==
=== Arrest of Thomas Overton ===
On November 19, 1996, five years after the MacIvors' murders, the police arrested a male suspect named Thomas Mitchell Overton (November 5, 1955 – November 19, 2026; also known as Thomas Michael Overton). He was in police custody for unrelated burglary charges at the time.

Overton was first named as a suspect in April 1993 when police questioned him about the crime. Overton denied that he was involved and he refused to take part in a DNA test then to exclude his involvement. After his arrest for burglary in 1996, Overton attempted suicide by cutting his neck with a razor blade. He survived and a sample of his blood was collected from his jail cell and sent for DNA testing. The DNA in the blood sample matched that of semen found at the crime scene. Other evidence came from Michael's sister. She said that the day before she was murdered, Missy told her that an attendant at an Amoco gas station had flirted with her, but she rejected him and found him creepy. That attendant was later identified as Overton.

On December 10, 1996, Overton was indicted by a Monroe County grand jury for two counts of first-degree murder and one count of murdering an unborn child.

=== Suspected crime ===
In addition to the MacIvors's murders, Overton was a suspect of murdering Rachelle Surrett, a 20-year-old woman who disappeared on March 5, 1990 after her father dropped her off outside a movie theater. Surrett remained missing until her decomposed body was discovered in May that same year. Investigations discovered that Overton worked at the theater where her father dropped her off and that Surrett previously told her father that Overton made her feel nervous. When Overton was probed by the police regarding the case, he claimed that he had a date with Surrett on the night of her disappearance, but he denied any involvement in the crime. The police did not have any evidence to conclusively identify Overton as the killer, and as of 2026, he was not charged with a crime related to Surrett's murder.

=== Pre-trial motions and trial date orders ===
In June 1997, Overton was scheduled to stand trial on October 20, 1997.

In September 1997, a month before Overton was set to stand trial, his lawyers filed a motion, asking the trial judge, Circuit Judge Steven Shea, to remove himself from the case. They alleged that he was biased against Overton and that he had subjected the defendant to unfair treatment. Judge Shea refused to withdraw himself from the case.

On October 1, 1997, after processing the defence's request, Chief Judge Sandra Taylor agreed to change the trial judge to Circuit Court Judge Mark Jones.

In December 1997, Overton's trial date, which had been previously set to begin in February 1998, was re-scheduled to take place in May 1998.

In February 1998, Overton filed his second motion to replace his defense counsel. his request was denied by Judge Jones who ruled that Overton's lawyers had provided him adequate legal representation throughout the legal process.

In March 1998, Overton's trial was postponed until the end of the summer season of 1998.

In June 1998, Overton's counsel requested that the court bar the DNA evidence from being admitted as evidence during the murder trial.

In early January 1999, Overton's trial was scheduled to begin later that month. Law enforcement believed that he posed a high security risk because of his large size and his escape from a mental hospital in Georgia in the 1970s. They considered requiring him to wear a shock belt and shackles during court appearances.

== Overton's confession ==
The following was the version of events based on Overton's confession to a fellow prisoner about the double murder. That prisoner, James Zientek, would later become one of the prosecution's key witnesses against Overton in his trial for the MacIvors' murders.

Overton's said he first met Missy at the gas station where he worked and, after several interactions with her, he noticed that she stopped coming to the station. He got her address off a receipt and decided to go to her house to rape her. On the night of August 21, 1991, he went to her house where he climbed a ladder to reach the second floor. He cut the phone lines and used a clothesline to restrain Missy and her husband.

After he entered the house, Overton encountered Michael who was grabbing a late-night snack. He struck him in the back of the head with a pipe, but the blow did not knock Michael unconscious and the two of them briefly scuffled until Overton struck Michael with his fist knocking him unconscious. While Overton and Michael were fighting, Missy came from the bedroom and saw them. She recognized Overton and reportedly exclaimed, "I know who you are. Why are you doing this to me?"

Overton said he restrained Missy then killed Michael by strangling him with a necktie after covering his eyes with socks and his face with masking tape. Next, Overton went to the master bedroom where he raped Missy before he strangled her with a tie. Overton told Zientek that after murdering the couple, he ripped a page out of their address book and left a shell casing. He said that he hoped those things would mislead the investigators. He stole some pictures of Missy's abdomen during her pregnancy to keep as trophies of the murders. Overton also showed Zientek various photographs of the crime scene.

== Murder trial of Overton ==
=== Cases of the prosecution and defense ===
FDOC mugshot of Thomas Overton

Thomas Overton stood trial in late January 1999 for first-degree murder resulting in the death of Missy and Michael MacIvor. The prosecution argued that Overton was responsible for the MacIvors' deaths and that he raped Missy before he murdered her. They summoned Donald Pope, a serologist, who testified Overton's DNA matched semen found on the bedding in the victims bedroom and there was only one chance in six billion that the DNA did not belong to Overton.

The defense argued that Overton was innocent and alleged that the DNA evidence was planted by the investigators to frame Overton as the perpetrator. Overton testified that on the night of the murders, he was at work at the Amoco station where he was employed, but his time card was destroyed preventing him from submitting it as evidence. He testified that he had a previous relationship with a female deputy who he said was framing him, but the deputy denied any history of a relationship with him. Defense counsel repeated these claims during their closing arguments.

During the trial, James Zientek, who met Overton while they were incarcerated together before the trial, testified that Overton told him that he had murdered the couple. In his testimony, Zientek repeated the details stated to him by Overton. Zientek added that Overton sought his help with an elaborate scheme that he intended to carry out to frame another inmate for the murders. Zientek said that Overton told him that if he assisted with the scheme, then he would be viewed as having helped to solve the murder case. That good behavior would help him negotiate with the prosecutor about the rape charges he was facing at the time and Overton would be released from jail. Zientek was visibly emotional as he delivered his testimony. He explained that he had been so disturbed by the gruesome photographs of the crime scene shown to him by Overton that he decided to expose Overton's scheme to law enforcement officers. William Guy Green, another inmate, testified that Overton had told him about killing the couple, although his testimony differed that of Zientek. Guy said that Overton told him that the murders were part of a burglary done as a "hit" for another person.

=== Conviction and death penalty ===
On February 1, 1999, Overton was found guilty of both counts of first-degree murder.

On February 4, 1999, by a majority vote of 8–4, the jury voted to sentence Overton to death for the double murder. Later, sources revealed that the exact jury vote was 8–4 for the death penalty for Michael's murder and 9–3 for the death penalty for Missy's murder.

On February 22, 1999, during a final pre-sentencing hearing, Overton insisted he was innocent and that he never killed the couple. State Attorney Jon Ellsworth urged the judge to follow the jury's decision and sentence Overton to death for the murders. A sentencing date of March 18, 1999 was set.

On March 18, 1999, Overton was sentenced to death in the electric chair by Circuit Judge Mark Jones. The judge remarked that the murders were callous, atrocious, and premeditated. After considering the brutality of the crimes and Overton's previous felony conviction, he found the death penalty appropriate. Overton was also sentenced to life in prison for burglary and rape, plus 15 years for the murder of the couple's unborn child.

=== 2001 burglary conviction ===
In 2001, two years after he was condemned to die, Overton stood trial for the 1996 burglary that had led to his arrest. He was convicted and sentenced to life in prison for that offense. Prosecutors said that sentence ensured that would he spend the rest of his life in prison even if his murder convictions and death sentence were overturned.

== Appeals ==
On March 8, 2001, Thomas Overton filed an appeal with the Florida Supreme Court seeking to vacate his death sentences. On September 13, 2001, the Florida Supreme Court dismissed Overton's appeal.

On May 13, 2002, the U.S. Supreme Court dismissed Overton's appeal of his death sentence.

On November 29, 2007, Overton lost a second appeal to the Florida Supreme Court.

In January 2012, Overton filed an appeal seeking a new trial for the double murder. The appeal was forwarded for a hearing later that month. On April 13, 2012, Monroe County Circuit Judge Mark Jones rejected Overton's post-conviction appeal.

On August 13, 2013, the Florida Supreme Court dismissed Overton's follow-up appeal against Judge Jones's ruling.

In early 2016, following the landmark decision of Hurst v. Florida, which declared the death penalty in Florida as partially unconstitutional due to the judges having too much power compared to juries in deciding on the death sentence, the condemned inmates from Florida had a possible chance to either receive re-sentencing trials or commute their sentences to life without parole. Furthermore, the state of Florida changed its law to require a unanimous vote by a jury to impose the death penalty. Overton's case was reviewed because his sentence was imposed by a non-unanimous jury vote. However, in December 2016, it was decided that the Hurst decision only applied retroactively to death sentences that were finalized after 2002. Overton's sentence was imposed in 1999 and finalized before 2002, making him ineligible for re-sentencing.

On February 2, 2018, the Florida Supreme Court denied Overton's re-sentencing petition after they found that he was ineligible to be re-sentenced because his sentence was finalized in May 2002, two months before the date allowed by the landmark ruling Ring v. Arizona.

On June 26, 2025, Overton's appeal was rejected by the 11th Circuit Court of Appeals.

On February 23, 2026, Overton's final petition for a writ of certiorari was denied by the U.S. Supreme Court.

== Death row and execution ==
From 2003 to 2015, Thomas Overton was one of three inmates on Florida's death row to be convicted of murders from the Florida Keys region. The other two were Michael Anthony Tanzi, who was sentenced in 2003 for the 2000 rape and murder of Janet Acosta, and Lloyd Chase Allen, who was sentenced in 1993 for the 1991 kidnapping and murder of Dortha Cribbs. The number was reduced to two after Allen died at the age of 69 in July 2015 while in prison awaiting his execution.

In July 2023, Steven Matthew Wolf was sentenced to death for the 2018 rape and murder of Michelle Osborne in the Florida Keys area, making him the third alongside Overton and Tanzi from Florida Keys awaiting execution in the state. Tanzi was executed in April 2025, leaving only Wolf and Overton as the last remaining Florida Keys prisoners on the state's death row.

On October 21, 2026, Governor Ron DeSantis signed Overton's death warrant and ordered his sentence to be carried out on November 19, 2026. The execution order was signed just one day after the execution of William Reaves for the 1986 murder of Indian River County police officer Richard Raczkoski.

More than a week before Overton's scheduled execution, a newspaper article reported that Michael's sister said she wanted to witness the execution of Overton. She was reported as saying that she hoped the execution would give her closure after losing her brother, her sister-in-law, and her unborn nephew in 1991. She described the couple as "two great humans" with a "great love for life". She said that her parents had died before Overton's death warrant was announced, and she was going to witness the execution for them too.

On November 13, 2026, the Florida Supreme Court dismissed Overton's last-minute appeal against his death sentence. After losing his final state appeal, Overton appealed to the U.S. Supreme Court for a stay of execution as a final recourse.

On November 19, 2026, Thomas Mitchell Overton was put to death by lethal injection in the Florida State Prison at 6:19 p.m. In his final statement, he said, "I never killed anyone." Overton was the 20th person to be executed in the state of Florida, which broke the previous year's record of 19 executions in Florida in a single year.

== Aftermath ==
The murders of the MacIvors became known as one of the most brutal murders to occur in the Florida Keys. In January 2021, the murders of the MacIvors were re-enacted by true-crime show Florida Man Murders. It appeared as the second episode of the show's first season.

== See also ==
- Capital punishment in Florida
- List of people executed in Florida
- List of people executed in the United States in 2026
