= Murder of Richard Raczkoski =

1986 murder of a police officer in Florida

- Richard Raczkoski, who became the first Indian River County police officer to be murdered in the line of duty
- Location: Vero Beach, Florida, United States
- Date: September 23, 1986
- Attack type: Murder by shooting
- Motive: To avoid arrest
- Verdict: Guilty
- Convictions: First-degree murder
- Sentence: Death (March 6, 1992)
- Convicted: William Reaves

The murder of Richard Raczkoski (October 30, 1956 – September 23, 1986), a 29-year-old police corporal and Indian River County Sheriff's Deputy, occurred on September 23, 1986, in Vero Beach, Florida, United States. While responding to a 911 call, Raczkoski was shot to death by a man named William Reaves Jr. (December 30, 1948 – October 20, 2026) in front of a local convenience store. Reaves was later arrested in Georgia, and extradited to Florida to be charged with Raczkoski's murder. Reaves was found guilty of first-degree murder and sentenced to death. He was executed on October 20, 2026, 40 years after he murdered the officer.

== Murder ==
On September 23, 1986, at 3 am, in Vero Beach, Florida, 29-year-old police corporal Richard Raczkoski, a sheriff's deputy of the Indian River County Sheriff's Office, responded to a 911 call made from a phone booth outside a convenience store in Vero Beach. Minutes after arriving at the scene, Raczkoski was shot outside the store, and his body was found with four gunshot wounds. An autopsy report showed that three bullets penetrated his vital organs and caused extensive internal hemorrhage.

According to a witness, he saw an African-American man, wearing a white T-shirt and red shorts, running away from the scene; the witness noted that the man's manner of running resembled that of soldiers under fire during the Vietnam War. Inside Raczkoski's car, the police found a note, which said: "William Reaves Jr., black male, 4336 38th Avenue, date of birth 12/30/48". A witness, Eugene Hinton, testified that he had seen Reaves wearing red shorts and carrying a gun wrapped in a white T-shirt, and Reaves told Hinton that he had shot a police officer. Another witness also testified that Reaves was wearing a white T-shirt and red shorts on the afternoon before the murder. Reaves previously served in the military during the Vietnam War, which explained the description of his manner of running.

The police managed to arrest Reaves in Albany, Georgia, two days after the shooting. Reaves later confessed to killing Raczkoski, and recounted that on the date of the murder, while in the middle of a conversation with Raczkoski, a gun fell out of Reaves's shorts and the officer put his knee on the weapon. Reaves pushed the knee away, retrieved his gun, and refused to surrender it. Reaves claimed that he panicked and was also under the influence of drugs, which led to him shooting Raczkoski three times in the back and once on the shoulder.

Based on official prison records, Reaves had three prior convictions—robbery, grand theft, and selling heroin—between 1973 and 1984. For the robbery conviction, he served four years of an eight-year sentence from 1973 to 1977. He later served four years of a five-year sentence for grand theft from 1979 to 1983. In the third case, involving the sale of heroin, Reaves was sentenced to three-and-a-half years' jail in 1984 but served only two-and-a-half years before being paroled in 1986.

== Trial of William Reaves Jr. ==
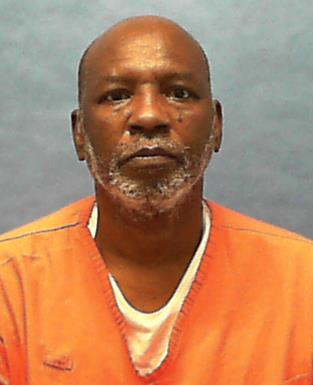
William Reaves Jr.

On September 25, 1986, William Reaves Jr. was returned to Florida to face investigation for the murder of Richard Raczkoski. Reaves was subsequently charged with first-degree murder. On October 8, 1986, Reaves was formally indicted by a grand jury for the murder of Raczkoski.

The trial was originally supposed to take place in Indian River County, but due to pre-trial publicity, the trial venue was changed to Sarasota County. During the proceedings, the defense argued that Reaves was under the influence of drugs and alcohol at the time of the murder, and he should not be convicted of first-degree murder, given that the killing was not premeditated. However, the prosecution submitted that the murder was premeditated and alluded to Reaves's extensive criminal record and attempt to evade arrest as factors in their upcoming submissions for the death penalty should Reaves be convicted as charged.

On August 25, 1987, Reaves was found guilty of first-degree murder for the death of Raczkoski. Under Florida state law, an offender found guilty of first-degree murder would face either the death penalty or life imprisonment without parole for at least 25 years. The jury was set to commence their deliberations on the sentence the next day.

On August 26, 1987, after 30 minutes of deliberation, by a unanimous decision, all 12 members of the jury voted to impose the death penalty on Reaves.

On September 2, 1987, Circuit Judge Jack Fenelly formally sentenced Reaves to death via the electric chair for the murder of Richard Raczkoski after following the jury's decision.

== Re-trial ==
On January 15, 1991, the Florida Supreme Court heard William Reaves's appeal and overturned his death sentence and murder conviction in favor of a new trial after it was found that one of the original trial's prosecutors had actually represented Reaves in a past case involving grand larceny charges, and hence remitted his case back to the trial court for a re-trial. The court ruling reportedly devastated Raczkoski's father, who was still in grief over the murder of his son. Assistant Attorney General Celia Terenzio appealed against the decision, but the Florida Supreme Court refused to reverse its ruling and denied her motion in March 1991, and was set to formally order a re-trial for Reaves.

Similar to Reaves's original trial, the trial location was moved from Indian River County to Marion County due to pre-trial publicity. The case was supposed to be re-tried in Sarasota County, but was transferred to Marion County for re-trial due to a lack of courtrooms at the Sarasota County Courthouse.

On February 17, 1992, the jury selection for Reaves's re-trial commenced. During the proceedings, the defence argued that Reaves's war experiences in Vietnam had a substantial influence on his psychiatric state and it also led to him suffering from diminished responsibility at the time of the murder, although the judge denied the testimony of the defence's psychiatric expert William Weitz.

On February 27, 1992, a Marion County jury found Reaves guilty and convicted him of first-degree murder a second time. As the trial moved on to the sentencing phase, the defence implored the jury not to sentence their client to death, stating that Reaves suffered from post-traumatic stress disorder (PTSD) due to his traumatic experiences during the Vietnam War.

On February 28, 1992, after nine hours of deliberations on the sentence, the jury voted 10–2 to recommend the death penalty for Reaves.

On March 6, 1992, Reaves was sentenced to death via electrocution by Circuit Judge James Balsiger. Before his sentencing, Reaves apologized to the family of Raczkoski for the killing.

== Appeals ==
On April 7, 1994, the Florida Supreme Court rejected Reaves's appeal against his death sentence and murder conviction.

On June 20, 2002, the Florida Supreme Court ordered an evidentiary hearing for Reaves to process his claims of ineffective counsel.

On September 14, 2006, the Florida Supreme Court rejected another post-conviction appeal from Reaves.

On May 30, 2013, the 11th Circuit Court of Appeals remanded the case of Reaves back to the lower federal court for an evidentiary hearing on the claims of ineffective counsel.

On September 28, 2017, the 11th Circuit Court of Appeals overturned the ruling of a federal district judge to grant post-conviction relief for Reaves.

On November 6, 2017, Reaves lost his second appeal to the 11th Circuit Court of Appeals and he intended to file one final appeal to the U.S. Supreme Court.

On May 29, 2018, the Florida Supreme Court dismissed the appeal of Reaves for re-sentencing. At that time, Florida's state laws had changed to make a jury sentence a person to death by a unanimous vote. Reaves's death sentence was imposed by a majority vote of 7–5. The court did not approve the re-sentencing plea as Reaves had already exhausted his appeals in 1999 and the law only applied to cases that occurred after June 24, 2002.

On June 25, 2018, the U.S. Supreme Court denied Reaves's final appeal.

As of 2018, among the total of 347 people on death row in Florida, Reaves was one of 12 inmates convicted of murders committed within the Treasure Coast.

== Execution ==
On September 18, 2026, nearly 40 years after the murder of Richard Raczkoski, Governor Ron DeSantis signed a death warrant for William Reaves, and scheduled his execution on October 20, 2026.

In response to the upcoming execution of his brother's killer, Raczkoski's brother Marc stated that the news brought a sense of closure and relief to him, although he conceded that the pain of losing his brother would still linger on as it did for the past 40 years to his family. Marc, who was 22 at the time of his brother's murder and was presently married with children, lamented the fact that his brother never had the chance to be an uncle to his nephews and nieces, and also never got to spend more time with his parents, and the festive seasons were no longer the same after the murder of Raczkoski. Indian River County Sheriff Eric Flowers, who previously pushed for the execution of Reaves, supported the decision and believed that this should be a priority case to be resolved given that Reaves's death sentence was imposed a long time ago and it should be carried out.

On October 2, an Indian River County Judge denied Reaves's appeal to overturn his death sentence. On October 8, Reaves's family appealed to the governor and asked for clemency, and hope that Reaves's death sentence would be commuted to life imprisonment. On October 14, the Florida Supreme Court denied Reaves's appeal to stay his execution.

On the afternoon of October 20, 2026, Reaves's final appeal to the U.S. Supreme Court was rejected. Later that evening, 77-year-old William Reaves Jr. was put to death by lethal injection in Florida State Prison. He was pronounced dead at 6:12 pm. When asked if he had any last words, he said, "No, I do not." Before his execution, he accepted a visit from his sister, nephew, brother, and a friend.

== Aftermath ==
Richard Raczkoski was the first Indian River County sheriff's deputy to be murdered in the line of duty. For the next 36 years following his murder, Raczkoski remained the only police officer from Indian River County to be murdered in the line of duty, until November 2025, when Terri Sweeting-Mashkow became the second sheriff's deputy from Indian River County to be murdered during a shooting incident while she was serving an eviction notice.

At the time of his murder, Raczkoski was survived by his parents, brother, and fiancée. Raczkoski's only child, a son, was born shortly after his death. The International Police Association posthumously awarded Raczkoski with the Medal of Valor in his honor.

In 2009, part of the Florida State Road 60 from I-95 to 43rd Avenue was renamed the Richard Raczkoski Memorial Highway to commemorate him.

In March 2024, the Indian River County Sheriff's Office dedicated a vintage 1986 Ford Crown Victoria patrol car in honor of Raczkoski.

On May 10, 2024, Raczkoski was one of several police officers who died in the line of duty to be honored in a memorial outside Indian River County Courthouse.

In July 2025, Indian River County Sheriff Eric Flowers publicly appealed to the Florida Governor Ron DeSantis to sign a death warrant for Reaves, stating that Reaves should be executed for the murder of Raczkoski. It was further reported that Raczkoski's parents had died but that his brother was still alive and waiting for Reaves's death sentence to be carried out.

== See also ==
- Capital punishment in Florida
- List of people executed in Florida
- List of people executed in the United States in 2026

Executions carried out in Florida
Preceded by James Robertson October 13, 2026	William Reaves Jr. October 20, 2026	Succeeded by Jesse Guardado November 5, 2026
Executions carried out in the United States
Preceded by James Robertson – Florida October 13, 2026	William Reaves Jr. – Florida; October 20, 2026	Succeeded by Jeffrey Allen Weisheit – Indiana November 5, 2026
