= Charles Lee Burton =

American convicted murderer and former death row prisoner in Alabama

- Born: Charles Lee Burton Jr. November 20, 1950 (age 75); Montgomery, Alabama, U.S.
- Other name: Sonny Burton
- Status: Incarcerated
- Motive: Robbery
- Conviction: Capital murder
- Penalty: Death; commuted to life imprisonment without parole

Details
- Victims: Douglas Levester Battle, 34
- Date: August 16, 1991
- Country: United States
- State: Alabama
- Imprisoned at: Kilby Correctional Facility

Charles Lee "Sonny" Burton Jr. (born November 20, 1950) is an American convicted murderer who had previously been on death row in Alabama for the murder of a patron during a 1991 robbery case prior to the commutation of his sentence to life imprisonment.

On August 16, 1991, Burton and five other men participated in the robbery of an AutoZone store in Talladega, Alabama, and during the robbery, one of Burton's accomplices, Derrick DeBruce, shot a patron of the store, Doug Battle, and the victim died as a result.

Despite not being the shooter, Burton was deemed the mastermind and sentenced to death together with DeBruce, in accordance with an Alabama law that allowed a participant of a felony robbery to be convicted of murder even if they did not cause any death(s). Although DeBruce's death sentence was later commuted to life without parole, Burton's death sentence was upheld through multiple appeals and he was originally scheduled to be executed by nitrogen hypoxia on March 12, 2026. His case sparked controversy due to the fact that he did not shoot the victim despite having taken part in the robbery, and lingering beliefs that he should not be executed.

On March 10, 2026, Alabama Governor Kay Ivey commuted Burton's death sentence to life in prison without possibility of parole.

== Murder of Doug Battle ==
On August 16, 1991, Charles Lee Burton Jr., then 40 years old, was one of six people who banded together to commit robbery at a AutoZone store in Talladega, Alabama. Upon their entry into the store, Burton, who pretended to be a customer at first, brandished a gun and ordered everyone inside the store to get down to the floor, and later aimed the gun at the store's manager, Larry McCardle, ordering him to take him to the safe. McCardle complied with Burton's demands.

During the hold-up, 34-year-old Douglas Levester Battle, also known as Doug Battle, unknowingly entered the store to buy something when he chanced upon the robbers. One of the robbers, 20-year-old Derrick Anthony DeBruce, aimed the gun at Battle and told him to get down. However, Battle had difficulty trying to get down. According to Battle's sister, Battle had knee problems, which contributed to him being too slow in heeding DeBruce's order to lie down.

Nevertheless, an argument broke out between Battle and DeBruce, and the latter hit Battle, who fell to the ground, and while Battle was lying face down, DeBruce shot him in the back. At that time of the shooting, Burton and the rest of the accomplices were about to leave or had already departed the store. DeBruce was the last to leave the store after the shooting, which led to the death of Battle.

According to the Talladega County Deputy Coroner Clarence Haynes, Battle died of a single fatal gunshot wound on his lower back, which penetrated his chest. Battle was the only person to be shot inside the store, and none of the seven other customers and three employees were injured. However, six of the surviving patrons were reported to have been robbed in the hold-up and an undetermined amount of money were also stolen from the store. At the time of his death, Battle was survived by his wife, one daughter and three sons. He was also a 1975 graduate of Talladega County Training School and formerly an employee of a plastics company for 15 years in Louisiana.

== Court proceedings ==
=== Arrest, trial and appeals ===
After the murder of Doug Battle, the police conducted investigations to search for the gang of robbers, who were last seen fleeing the store in a blue car. Two weeks after the crime, Charles Burton and Derrick DeBruce were both arrested in Montgomery, Alabama, and first charged with first-degree robbery.

A year after killing Battle, Burton stood trial for the offence of capital murder in early 1992 and was convicted as charged. On April 17, 1992, Burton was sentenced to death upon the jury's unanimous recommendation for capital punishment. The trial judge formally imposed the death sentence on May 8, 1992.

On December 30, 1993, Burton's direct appeal against his death sentence was denied by the Alabama Court of Criminal Appeals.

On September 16, 1994, the Alabama Supreme Court affirmed Burton's death sentence and dismissed his appeal.

As of December 2001, Burton was one of 14 inmates sentenced to death within Talladega County. A 2013 news report revealed that Burton was one of ten inmates held on Alabama's death row for murders committed within Talladega County.

On October 7, 2013, Burton's final appeal was denied by the U.S. Supreme Court.

=== Conviction and death of DeBruce ===
On February 11, 1992, DeBruce first stood trial for the capital murder of Battle. He was convicted that same month, and the jury likewise voted for the death penalty in his case. A judge formally sentenced DeBruce to death on March 13, 1992.

On March 5, 1993, the Alabama Court of Criminal Appeals rejected DeBruce's direct appeal against his death sentence.

On September 16, 1994, the Alabama Supreme Court dismissed DeBruce's appeal and upheld his death sentence in the same hearing as Burton's appeal.

On December 2, 2003, DeBruce's second appeal to the Alabama Court of Criminal Appeals was rejected.

In July 2014, the 11th U.S. Circuit Court of Appeals overturned DeBruce's death sentence after allowing his appeal and accepting there was insufficient and inaccurate evidence provided in his trial's mitigation phase. Eventually, after reaching a sentencing agreement with the state, DeBruce was re-sentenced to life imprisonment without the possibility of parole, thus escaping the death sentence. DeBruce would die in prison of unknown causes in 2020.

=== Fates of the four other accomplices ===
Willie Brantley and Andre Jones

On May 18, 1992, two of Burton's accomplices, 25-year-old Andre Lee Jones and 20-year-old Willie J. Brantley, pleaded guilty to lesser charges of felony murder. The pair were sentenced to life without parole at the end of their trials. Jones spent the next 30 years in prison before his death in 2022 from a pulmonary disease, while Brantley remains incarcerated as of 2026.

Deon Long and LuJuan McCants

On May 20, 1992, 20-year-old Deon D. Long and 16-year-old LuJuan Carl McCants likewise pleaded guilty to lesser charges of felony murder and robbery. Each of them were sentenced to 25 years in prison, and of the two, Long died by homicide behind bars in 2009, and McCants was released after he served 15 years. However, in 2015, McCants was arrested for an unrelated robbery charge.

== Controversy ==
There were controversies surrounding Burton's capital murder conviction and death sentence. First of all, Burton was sentenced to death for the murder of Battle, even though he never pulled the trigger, and Burton had denied ever killing anyone despite his voluntary participation in the robbery that took Battle's life. Burton was convicted under a legal doctrine in Alabama for felony murder, and this particular law ensured the prosecution of all co-perpetrators involved in certain felonies, such as robbery or burglary, equally culpable for a murder committed as a direct consequence of that said felony, and such cases were also punishable by death. This law was also upheld in the 1987 landmark ruling of Tison v. Arizona, in which the U.S. Supreme Court found it constitutional to sentence a defendant to death for a primary involvement in a felony resulting in death, whether or not there was an intent to cause the victim's death.

Furthermore, the disparity in the sentencing of both Burton and the triggerman, Derrick DeBruce, also sparked some backlash in the former's case, mainly due to the fact that DeBruce, who directly killed the victim, had his death sentence commuted to life without parole upon his appeal, and yet Burton himself still remained on death row and was facing execution without killing anyone. According to the Death Penalty Information Center, there were at least 22 executions of defendants convicted under felony murder statutes despite never killing any of the victims, and one of these people notably executed was Nathaniel Woods, who was convicted of murdering three police officers but never personally shot any one of them. Throughout the appellate process, the state had opposed Burton's appeals to overturn his death sentence, and they emphasized it was constitutional to execute Burton for his indirect involvement in the murder of Battle, whether or not he fired the fatal shot.

== Commutation of death sentence ==
=== Death warrant and scheduled execution ===
On January 22, 2026, the Alabama Supreme Court authorized the death warrant of Burton, and Alabama Governor Kay Ivey would set an execution date for Burton.

On February 5, 2026, Ivey scheduled Burton's death sentence to be carried out by nitrogen hypoxia on March 12, 2026. Eight years prior in 2018, Burton was one of the 56 inmates who chose to be executed by nitrogen hypoxia, which was then passed by the state as an alternative execution method apart from its primary option of lethal injection. The method was first used by Alabama to carry out the controversial execution of Kenneth Eugene Smith in 2024. Burton was reportedly the eighth condemned person scheduled to be put to death by nitrogen hypoxia in Alabama.

After the execution date was reported to the public, there were numerous calls for clemency in Burton's case, and some national advocacy groups, including the Council on American-Islamic Relations (CAIR), appealed to the state to commute his sentence. Battle's daughter appealed to the governor for clemency for Burton and cited her opposition to the execution of her father's killer. Six of the eight living jurors who voted for the death sentence in Burton's original murder trial also expressed their agreement to clemency and sparing Burton's life. Burton also petitioned for clemency from Alabama Governor, hoping to have his sentence commuted to life imprisonment, and he wrote an apology letter to the family of the victim to express remorse for his actions.

Apart from this, it was reported that during his incarceration on death row, Burton had experienced a multitude of health problems, including rheumatoid arthritis, which eventually led to Burton using the wheelchair due to limited mobility. Burton also suffered from a stroke recently before his scheduled execution, and he was diagnosed with a delusional disorder. There were concerns that Burton's old age of 75 and poor health should have precluded him from execution.

On the other hand, Alabama's Attorney-General Steve Marshall opposed to granting clemency to Burton, and Gina Maiola, the spokesperson for Ivey, stated that the governor was carefully deliberating over the case of Burton, but she also stated that Ivey had no intention of issuing clemency at that point. In fact, up to that point in her governorship tenure, Ivey had commuted only one death sentence to life without parole.

On March 3, 2026, Burton appealed to the U.S. Supreme Court to review his case.

=== Clemency ===
On March 10, 2026, Alabama Governor Kay Ivey commuted Burton's death sentence to life in prison without possibility of parole. Burton was the second prisoner on death row to be granted clemency by Ivey since she took office in 2017, the first being Robin Myers.

== See also ==
- Capital punishment in Alabama
- List of longest prison sentences served
