= Weightlifting at the 2023 SEA Games – Results =

The weightlifting competitions at the 2023 SEA Games took place at Chroy Changvar Convention Centre in Phnom Penh, Cambodia from 13 to 16 May 2023. The game will feature 14 events, 7 men and 7 women events. The 2023 Games featured 14 events.

== Results ==
Key
GR	SEA Games record

=== Men's 55 kg ===
Rank	Athlete	Nation	Snatch (kg)				Clean & Jerk (kg)				Total
Rank	Athlete	Nation	1	2	3	Result	1	2	3	Result	Total
1st place, gold medalist(s)	Lại Gia Thành	Vietnam	116	119	121	121	~~140~~	140	~~149~~	140	261
2nd place, silver medalist(s)	Thada Somboon-uan	Thailand	115	~~118~~	118	118	130	~~144~~	~~144~~	130	248
3rd place, bronze medalist(s)	Mohammad Husni	Indonesia	100	113	~~117~~	113	~~120~~	120	~~136~~	120	233
4	Nasod Thy	Laos	~~80~~	~~80~~	80	80	101	~~105~~	106	106	186
5	Sehya Pich	Cambodia	~~80~~	81	~~85~~	81	100	104	~~107~~	104	185

=== Men's 61 kg ===
Rank	Athlete	Nation	Snatch (kg)				Clean & Jerk (kg)				Total
Rank	Athlete	Nation	1	2	3	Result	1	2	3	Result	Total
1st place, gold medalist(s)	Eko Yuli Irawan	Indonesia	133	~~137~~	~~137~~	133	161	~~166~~	170	170 GR	303
2nd place, silver medalist(s)	John Ceniza	Philippines	125	128	~~130~~	128	160	164	169	169	297
3rd place, bronze medalist(s)	Teerapat Chomchuen	Thailand	128	~~131~~	131	131	160	165	~~169~~	165	294
4	Mohammad Bakar	Brunei	~~100~~	~~100~~	100	100	123	126	~~131~~	126	226
—	Nguyễn Trần Anh Tuấn	Vietnam	~~126~~	~~126~~	~~128~~	—	—	—	—	—	—

=== Men's 67 kg ===
Rank	Athlete	Nation	Snatch (kg)				Clean & Jerk (kg)				Total
Rank	Athlete	Nation	1	2	3	Result	1	2	3	Result	Total
1st place, gold medalist(s)	Trần Minh Trí	Vietnam	126	130	~~133~~	130	162	168	176	176 GR	306
2nd place, silver medalist(s)	Witsanu Chantri	Thailand	137	~~140~~	~~140~~	137	163	168	~~171~~	168	305
3rd place, bronze medalist(s)	Mohammad Yasin	Indonesia	130	~~137~~	137	137	162	167	~~170~~	167	304
4	Dave Pacaldo	Philippines	125	128	131	131	160	166	~~170~~	166	297
5	Ny Chanthanun	Cambodia	70	~~75~~	76	76	80	84	88	88	164
—	Daniel Dahlan	Malaysia	125	~~128~~	128	128	~~155~~	~~160~~	~~160~~	—	—

=== Men's 73 kg ===
Rank	Athlete	Nation	Snatch (kg)				Clean & Jerk (kg)				Total
Rank	Athlete	Nation	1	2	3	Result	1	2	3	Result	Total
1st place, gold medalist(s)	Rizki Juniansyah	Indonesia	~~143~~	143	156	156 GR	176	~~191~~	191	191 GR	347 GR
2nd place, silver medalist(s)	Anucha Doungsri	Thailand	135	140	~~142~~	140	165	170	175	175	315
3rd place, bronze medalist(s)	Kỷ Bùi Sư	Vietnam	~~136~~	~~136~~	136	136	150	175	~~180~~	175	311
4	Duch Bunroth	Cambodia	95	98	~~103~~	98	115	118	121	121	219
—	Muhammad Erry Hidayat	Malaysia	~~135~~	~~135~~	~~135~~	—	—	—	—	—	—

=== Men's 81 kg ===
Rank	Athlete	Nation	Snatch (kg)				Clean & Jerk (kg)				Total
Rank	Athlete	Nation	1	2	3	Result	1	2	3	Result	Total
1st place, gold medalist(s)	Rahmat Erwin Abdullah	Indonesia	150	158	—	158 GR	190	201	—	201 GR	359 GR
2nd place, silver medalist(s)	Chatuphum Chinnawong	Thailand	140	150	~~158~~	150	160	165	175	175	325
3rd place, bronze medalist(s)	Thi Ha Aung	Myanmar	110	120	125	125	150	160	165	165	290
4	Yin Sokleng	Cambodia	80	83	~~86~~	86	~~100~~	103	105	105	188

=== Men's 89 kg ===
Rank	Athlete	Nation	Snatch (kg)				Clean & Jerk (kg)				Total
Rank	Athlete	Nation	1	2	3	Result	1	2	3	Result	Total
1st place, gold medalist(s)	Nguyễn Quốc Toàn	Vietnam	150	155	~~157~~	155 GR	185	190	~~191~~	190 GR	345 GR
2nd place, silver medalist(s)	Muhammad Zul Ilmi	Indonesia	145	~~151~~	~~151~~	145	177	183	~~201~~	183	328
3rd place, bronze medalist(s)	John Tabique	Philippines	130	140	~~145~~	140	160	170	~~175~~	170	310
4	José Garcia	Timor-Leste	85	90	95	95	110	113	117	117	217

=== Men's +89 kg ===
Rank	Athlete	Nation	Snatch (kg)				Clean & Jerk (kg)				Total
Rank	Athlete	Nation	1	2	3	Result	1	2	3	Result	Total
1st place, gold medalist(s)	Trần Đình Thắng	Vietnam	~~148~~	150	~~155~~	150	196	~~209~~	209	209 GR	359 GR
2nd place, silver medalist(s)	Rungsuriya Panya	Thailand	150	155	~~157~~	155 GR	195	200	203	203	358
3rd place, bronze medalist(s)	Yan Myo Kyaw	Myanmar	120	~~140~~	140	140	160	~~182~~	—	160	300
4	Sorn Pou	Cambodia	95	~~99~~	100	100	110	113	117	117	217

=== Women's 45 kg ===
Rank	Athlete	Nation	Snatch (kg)				Clean & Jerk (kg)				Total
Rank	Athlete	Nation	1	2	3	Result	1	2	3	Result	Total
1st place, gold medalist(s)	Zin May Oo	Myanmar	65	~~70~~	71	71	~~93~~	~~93~~	93	93	164
2nd place, silver medalist(s)	Angeline Colonia	Philippines	~~68~~	68	~~71~~	68	~~80~~	80	~~83~~	80	148
3rd place, bronze medalist(s)	Bouakham Phongsakone	Laos	~~50~~	51	~~55~~	51	67	~~70~~	71	71	122
4	Seng Borin	Cambodia	47	50	55	55	55	60	63	63	118
—	Khemika Kamnoedsri	Thailand	69	~~71~~	72	72				—	—

=== Women's 49 kg ===
Rank	Athlete	Nation	Snatch (kg)				Clean & Jerk (kg)				Total
Rank	Athlete	Nation	1	2	3	Result	1	2	3	Result	Total
1st place, gold medalist(s)	Sanikun Tanasan	Thailand	83	~~86~~	86	86	100	105	~~108~~	105	191
2nd place, silver medalist(s)	Lovely Inan	Philippines	~~78~~	78	~~80~~	78	96	~~100~~	100	100	178
3rd place, bronze medalist(s)	Luluk Diana Tri Wijayana	Indonesia	74	~~78~~	78	78	85	95	~~97~~	95	173
4	Liyana Sidek	Brunei	~~53~~	53	~~56~~	53	67	~~71~~	~~71~~	67	120
5	Tan Poch	Cambodia	50	~~53~~	~~53~~	50	55	58	~~63~~	58	108
—	Thi My Dung Tran	Vietnam	~~79~~	~~79~~	~~79~~	—	—	—	—	—	—

=== Women's 55 kg ===
Rank	Athlete	Nation	Snatch (kg)				Clean & Jerk (kg)				Total
Rank	Athlete	Nation	1	2	3	Result	1	2	3	Result	Total
1st place, gold medalist(s)	Juliana Klarisa	Indonesia	83	~~86~~	86	86	100	~~105~~	105	105	191
2nd place, silver medalist(s)	Rosalinda Faustino	Philippines	77	~~80~~	80	80	95	104	~~107~~	104	184
3rd place, bronze medalist(s)	Try Sopheakreach	Cambodia	35	36	~~37~~	36	45	46	47	47	83
—	Nguyễn Thị Thúy Tiền	Vietnam	~~83~~	83	85	85	~~101~~	~~101~~	~~101~~	—	—
—	Poisian Yodsarn	Thailand	~~83~~	~~83~~	~~83~~	—	—	—	—	—	—

=== Women's 59 kg ===
Rank	Athlete	Nation	Snatch (kg)				Clean & Jerk (kg)				Total
Rank	Athlete	Nation	1	2	3	Result	1	2	3	Result	Total
1st place, gold medalist(s)	Elreen Ando	Philippines	92	96	98	98 GR	118	-	-	118 GR	216 GR
2nd place, silver medalist(s)	Suratwadee Yodsarn	Thailand	86	89	91	91	111	~~115~~	115	115	206
3rd place, bronze medalist(s)	Hoàng Thị Duyên	Vietnam	~~93~~	93	~~97~~	93	~~112~~	112	~~116~~	112	205
4	Sarah	Indonesia	85	89	~~91~~	89	105	~~110~~	114	114	203
5	Naw Ta Boe Yar	Myanmar	81	~~85~~	~~85~~	81	105	~~108~~	~~108~~	105	186
6	Nur Atikah Sobri	Malaysia	80	85	~~88~~	85	100	~~105~~	~~105~~	100	185
7	Kong Keomororkot	Laos	~~40~~	~~40~~	40	40	54	55	59	59	99

=== Women's 64 kg ===
Rank	Athlete	Nation	Snatch (kg)				Clean & Jerk (kg)				Total
Rank	Athlete	Nation	1	2	3	Result	1	2	3	Result	Total
1st place, gold medalist(s)	Tsabitha Alfiah Ramadani	Indonesia	~~92~~	92	97	97	107	~~110~~	~~110~~	107	204
2nd place, silver medalist(s)	Đinh Thị Thu Uyên	Vietnam	93	96	~~98~~	96	98	~~109~~	~~109~~	98	194
3rd place, bronze medalist(s)	Nur Syazwani Radzi	Malaysia	73	80	~~82~~	80	97	104	~~115~~	104	184
4	Roeun Sreynith	Cambodia	55	~~58~~	~~58~~	55	65	67	69	69	124

=== Women's 71 kg ===
Rank	Athlete	Nation	Snatch (kg)				Clean & Jerk (kg)				Total
Rank	Athlete	Nation	1	2	3	Result	1	2	3	Result	Total
1st place, gold medalist(s)	Vanessa Sarno	Philippines	95	100	105	105 GR	120	--	—	120	225
2nd place, silver medalist(s)	Thipwara Chontavin	Thailand	92	~~95~~	95	95	~~113~~	113	~~117~~	113	208
3rd place, bronze medalist(s)	Restu Anggi	Indonesia	88	91	~~93~~	91	97	110	115	115	206
4	Lam Thi My Le	Vietnam	~~90~~	~~90~~	90	90	100	112	115	115	205

=== Women's +71 kg ===
Rank	Athlete	Nation	Snatch (kg)				Clean & Jerk (kg)				Total
Rank	Athlete	Nation	1	2	3	Result	1	2	3	Result	Total
1st place, gold medalist(s)	Duangaksorn Chaidee	Thailand	115	120	122	122	140	~~148~~	148	148	270
2nd place, silver medalist(s)	Nurul Akmal	Indonesia	105	111	115	115	143	148	~~156~~	148	263
3rd place, bronze medalist(s)	Pha Si Rô	Vietnam	98	102	106	106	126	135	140	140	246
4	Kristel Macrohon	Philippines	95	~~101~~	101	101	120	~~125~~	~~125~~	120	221
