= List of Indonesian records in Olympic weightlifting =

The following are the national records in Olympic weightlifting in Indonesia. Records are maintained in each weight class for the snatch lift, clean and jerk lift, and the total for both lifts by the All Indonesia Weightlifting Bodybuilding Powerlifting Association.

== Current records ==
=== Men ===
| Event | Record | Athlete | Date | Meet | Place | Ref |
60 kg
| Snatch | 132 kg | Ricko Saputra | 13 December 2025 | SEA Games | Chonburi, Thailand | |
| Clean & Jerk | 168 kg | Ricko Saputra | 24 September 2026 | Asian Games | Nagoya, Japan | |
| Total | 298 kg | Ricko Saputra | 24 September 2026 | Asian Games | Nagoya, Japan | |
65 kg
| Snatch | 139 kg | Leonardo Adventino Geovani | 9 November 2025 | Islamic Solidarity Games | Riyadh, Saudi Arabia | |
| Clean & Jerk | 167 kg | Eko Yuli Irawan | 24 September 2026 | Asian Games | Nagoya, Japan | |
| Total | 304 kg | Eko Yuli Irawan | 14 December 2025 | SEA Games | Chonburi, Thailand | |
70 kg
| Snatch | 132 kg | Ardaraya | 14 December 2025 | SEA Games | Chonburi, Thailand | |
| Clean & Jerk | 170 kg | Ardaraya | 14 December 2025 | SEA Games | Chonburi, Thailand | |
| Total | 305 kg | Ardaraya | 14 December 2025 | SEA Games | Chonburi, Thailand | |
75 kg
| Snatch | 160 kg | Rahmat Erwin Abdullah | 26 September 2026 | Asian Games | Nagoya, Japan | |
| Clean & Jerk | 206 kg | Rahmat Erwin Abdullah | 26 September 2026 | Asian Games | Nagoya, Japan | |
| Total | 366 kg | Rahmat Erwin Abdullah | 26 September 2026 | Asian Games | Nagoya, Japan | |
88 kg
| Snatch | 160 kg | Abdullah Rahmat Erwin | 16 December 2025 | SEA Games | Chonburi, Thailand | |
| Clean & Jerk | 202 kg | Abdullah Rahmat Erwin | 16 December 2025 | SEA Games | Chonburi, Thailand | |
| Total | 362 kg | Abdullah Rahmat Erwin | 16 December 2025 | SEA Games | Chonburi, Thailand | |
94 kg
| Snatch | 143 kg | Ilmi M Zul | 16 December 2025 | SEA Games | Chonburi, Thailand | |
| Clean & Jerk | 187 kg | Ilmi M Zul | 16 December 2025 | SEA Games | Chonburi, Thailand | |
| Total | 330 kg | Ilmi M Zul | 16 December 2025 | SEA Games | Chonburi, Thailand | |
110 kg
| Snatch | | | | | | |
| Clean & Jerk | | | | | | |
| Total | | | | | | |
+110 kg
| Snatch | | | | | | |
| Clean & Jerk | 195 kg | Muhammad Ripqy Ramadhan | 12 November 2025 | Islamic Solidarity Games | Riyadh, Saudi Arabia | |
| Total | | | | | | |

=== Women ===
| Event | Record | Athlete | Date | Meet | Place | Ref |
48 kg
| Snatch | 84 kg | Wijayana Luluk Diana Tri | 13 December 2025 | SEA Games | Chonburi, Thailand | |
| Clean & Jerk | 100 kg | Wijayana Luluk Diana Tri | 13 December 2025 | SEA Games | Chonburi, Thailand | |
| Total | 184 kg | Wijayana Luluk Diana Tri | 13 December 2025 | SEA Games | Chonburi, Thailand | |
53 kg
| Snatch | 86 kg | Basilia Bamerop Ninggan | 8 November 2025 | Islamic Solidarity Games | Riyadh, Saudi Arabia | |
| Clean & Jerk | 107 kg | Basilia Bamerop Ninggan | 8 November 2025 | Islamic Solidarity Games | Riyadh, Saudi Arabia | |
| Total | 193 kg | Basilia Bamerop Ninggan | 8 November 2025 | Islamic Solidarity Games | Riyadh, Saudi Arabia | |
58 kg
| Snatch | 98 kg | Natasya Beteyob | 14 December 2025 | SEA Games | Chonburi, Thailand | |
| Clean & Jerk | 120 kg | Natasya Beteyob | 14 December 2025 | SEA Games | Chonburi, Thailand | |
| Total | 218 kg | Natasya Beteyob | 14 December 2025 | SEA Games | Chonburi, Thailand | |
63 kg
| Snatch | 95 kg | Sarah Aca | 15 December 2025 | SEA Games | Chonburi, Thailand | |
| Clean & Jerk | 117 kg | Nadita Aprilia | 10 November 2025 | Islamic Solidarity Games | Riyadh, Saudi Arabia | |
| Total | 211 kg | Nadita Aprilia | 10 November 2025 | Islamic Solidarity Games | Riyadh, Saudi Arabia | |
69 kg
| Snatch | 99 kg | Indah Afriza | 15 December 2025 | SEA Games | Chonburi, Thailand | |
| Clean & Jerk | 128 kg | Indah Afriza | 15 December 2025 | SEA Games | Chonburi, Thailand | |
| Total | 227 kg | Indah Afriza | 15 December 2025 | SEA Games | Chonburi, Thailand | |
77 kg
| Snatch | 91 kg | Pertiwi Alyamaulida Kartika | 17 December 2025 | SEA Games | Chonburi, Thailand | |
| Clean & Jerk | 115 kg | Pertiwi Alyamaulida Kartika | 17 December 2025 | SEA Games | Chonburi, Thailand | |
| Total | 206 kg | Pertiwi Alyamaulida Kartika | 17 December 2025 | SEA Games | Chonburi, Thailand | |
86 kg
| Snatch | | | | | | |
| Clean & Jerk | | | | | | |
| Total | | | | | | |
+86 kg
| Snatch | | | | | | |
| Clean & Jerk | 126 kg | Jihan Syafitri | 12 November 2025 | Islamic Solidarity Games | Riyadh, Saudi Arabia | |
| Total | | | | | | |

== Historical records ==
=== Men (2018–2025) ===
| Event | Record | Athlete | Date | Meet | Place | Ref |
55 kg
| Snatch | 115 kg | Satrio Nugroho | 5 September 2023 | World Championships | Riyadh, Saudi Arabia | |
| Clean & Jerk | 140 kg | Surahmat Wijoyo | 1 December 2019 | Southeast Asian Games | Manila, Philippines | |
| Total | 254 kg | Satrio Nugroho | 4 December 2023 | IWF Grand Prix | Doha, Qatar | |
61 kg
| Snatch | 143 kg | Eko Yuli Irawan | 3 November 2018 | World Championships | Ashgabat, Turkmenistan | |
| Clean & Jerk | 174 kg | Eko Yuli Irawan | 3 November 2018 | World Championships | Ashgabat, Turkmenistan | |
| Total | 317 kg | Eko Yuli Irawan | 3 November 2018 | World Championships | Ashgabat, Turkmenistan | |
67 kg
| Snatch | 146 kg | Eko Yuli Irawan | 7 September 2023 | World Championships | Riyadh, Saudi Arabia | |
| Clean & Jerk | 176 kg | Eko Yuli Irawan | 10 June 2023 | IWF Grand Prix | Havana, Cuba | |
| Total | 321 kg | Eko Yuli Irawan | 10 June 2023 | IWF Grand Prix | Havana, Cuba | |
73 kg
| Snatch | 164 kg | Rizki Juniansyah | 4 April 2024 | World Cup | Phuket, Thailand | |
| Clean & Jerk | 205 kg | Rahmat Erwin Abdullah | 11 May 2025 | Asian Championships | Jiangshan, China | |
| Total | 365 kg | Rizki Juniansyah | 4 April 2024 | World Cup | Phuket, Thailand | |
81 kg
| Snatch | 161 kg | Rahmat Erwin Abdullah | 9 December 2023 | IWF Grand Prix II | Doha, Qatar | |
| Clean & Jerk | 209 kg | Rahmat Erwin Abdullah | 11 September 2023 | World Championships | Riyadh, Saudi Arabia | |
| Total | 362 kg | Rahmat Erwin Abdullah | 9 December 2023 | IWF Grand Prix II | Doha, Qatar | |
89 kg
| Snatch | 155 kg | Muhammad Zul Ilmi | 14 August 2022 | Islamic Solidarity Games | Konya, Turkey | |
| Clean & Jerk | 187 kg | Muhammad Zul Ilmi | 22 May 2022 | Southeast Asian Games | Hanoi, Vietnam | |
| Total | 337 kg | Muhammad Zul Ilmi | 22 May 2022 | Southeast Asian Games | Hanoi, Vietnam | |
96 kg
| Snatch | | | | | | |
| Clean & Jerk | | | | | | |
| Total | | | | | | |
102 kg
| Snatch | | | | | | |
| Clean & Jerk | | | | | | |
| Total | | | | | | |
109 kg
| Snatch | | | | | | |
| Clean & Jerk | | | | | | |
| Total | | | | | | |
+109 kg
| Snatch | | | | | | |
| Clean & Jerk | | | | | | |
| Total | | | | | | |

=== Women (2018–2025) ===
| Event | Record | Athlete | Date | Meet | Place | Ref |
45 kg
| Snatch | 73 kg | Lisa Setiawati | 1 December 2019 | Southeast Asian Games | Manila, Philippines | |
| Clean & Jerk | 96 kg | Lisa Setiawati | 1 December 2019 | Southeast Asian Games | Manila, Philippines | |
| Total | 169 kg | Lisa Setiawati | 1 December 2019 | Southeast Asian Games | Manila, Philippines | |
49 kg
| Snatch | 87 kg | Windy Cantika Aisah | 17 April 2021 | Asian Championships | Tashkent, Uzbekistan | |
| Clean & Jerk | 110 kg | Windy Cantika Aisah | 24 July 2021 | Olympic Games | Tokyo, Japan | |
| Total | 194 kg | Windy Cantika Aisah | 24 July 2021 | Olympic Games | Tokyo, Japan | |
55 kg
| Snatch | 86 kg | Windy Cantika Aisah | 9 October 2022 | Asian Championships | Manama, Bahrain | |
| Clean & Jerk | 111 kg | Natasya Beteyob | 12 August 2022 | Islamic Solidarity Games | Konya, Turkey | |
| Total | 195 kg | Natasya Beteyob | 12 August 2022 | Islamic Solidarity Games | Konya, Turkey | |
59 kg
| Snatch | 98 kg | Natasya Beteyob | 3 April 2024 | World Cup | Phuket, Thailand | |
| Clean & Jerk | 117 kg | Natasya Beteyob | 2 October 2023 | Asian Games | Hangzhou, China | |
| Total | 213 kg | Natasya Beteyob | 3 April 2024 | World Cup | Phuket, Thailand | |
64 kg
| Snatch | 100 kg | Tsabitha Alfiah Ramadani | 21 May 2022 | Southeast Asian Games | Hanoi, Vietnam | |
| Clean & Jerk | 117 kg | Tsabitha Alfiah Ramadani | 10 September 2023 | World Championships | Riyadh, Saudi Arabia | |
| Total | 217 kg | Tsabitha Alfiah Ramadani | 10 September 2023 | World Championships | Riyadh, Saudi Arabia | |
71 kg
| Snatch | 102 kg | Tsabitha Ramadani | 7 February 2024 | Asian Championships | Tashkent, Uzbekistan | |
| Clean & Jerk | 120 kg | Restu Angi | 21 May 2022 | Southeast Asian Games | Hanoi, Vietnam | |
| Total | 221 kg | Tsabitha Ramadani | 10 December 2023 | IWF Grand Prix II | Doha, Qatar | |
76 kg
| Snatch | | | | | | |
| Clean & Jerk | | | | | | |
| Total | | | | | | |
81 kg
| Snatch | | | | | | |
| Clean & Jerk | | | | | | |
| Total | | | | | | |
87 kg
| Snatch | | | | | | |
| Clean & Jerk | | | | | | |
| Total | | | | | | |
+87 kg
| Snatch | 115 kg | Nurul Akmal | 2 August 2021 | Olympic Games | Tokyo, Japan | |
| Clean & Jerk | 153 kg | Nurul Akmal | 16 October 2022 | Asian Championships | Manama, Bahrain | |
| Total | 267 kg | Nurul Akmal | 16 October 2022 | Asian Championships | Manama, Bahrain | |
