= Weightlifting at the 2013 SEA Games – Men's 62 kg =

The men's 62 kg event at the 2013 SEA Games took place on 13 December 2013 at Thein Phyu Stadium.

== Schedule ==
All times are Myanmar Standard Time (UTC+06:30)

Date	Time	Event
Friday, 13 December 2013	16:00	Final

== Results ==
Rank	Athlete	Group	Body weight	Snatch (kg)				Clean & Jerk (kg)				Total
Rank	Athlete	Group	Body weight	1	2	3	Result	1	2	3	Result	Total
1st place, gold medalist(s)	Eko Yuli Irawan (INA)	A	62.00	132	135	137	137	158	162	167	167	304
2nd place, silver medalist(s)	Trung Le Quang (VIE)	A	61.85	128	~~131~~	131	131	158	160	~~168~~	160	291
3rd place, bronze medalist(s)	Myint Kyi (MYA)	A	61.60	125	130	~~133~~	130	~~159~~	159	~~161~~	159	289
4	Jeffrey Garcia (PHI)	A	61.85	120	~~125~~	~~125~~	120	160	~~170~~	~~170~~	160	280
5	Constantine Clement (MAS)	A	62.00	116	~~121~~	121	121	138	~~142~~	142	142	263

== New records ==
The following records were established during the competition.

Snatch	137	Eko Yuli Irawan (INA)	GR
Clean & Jerk	167	Eko Yuli Irawan (INA)	GR
Total	304	Eko Yuli Irawan (INA)	GR
