= Vietnam at the 2023 SEA Games =

Vietnam at the 2023 Southeast Asian Games
- IOC code: VIE
- NOC: Vietnam Olympic Committee
- Website: www.olympic.vn

in Phnom Penh, Cambodia
- Competitors: 702 in 37 sports
- Flag bearer: Nguyễn Huy Hoàng (Swimming)
- Officials: 301
- Medals Ranked 1st: Gold 136 Silver 105 Bronze 114 Total 355

Southeast Asian Games appearances (overview)
- 1989; 1991; 1993; 1995; 1997; 1999; 2001; 2003; 2005; 2007; 2009; 2011; 2013; 2015; 2017; 2019; 2021; 2023; 2025; 2027; 2029

Vietnam participated at the 2023 SEA Games which was held from 5 to 16 May 2023 in Phnom Penh, Cambodia.

== Medal summary ==
=== Medal by sport ===
Sport	1st place, gold medalist(s)	2nd place, silver medalist(s)	3rd place, bronze medalist(s)	Total	Rank
Basketball	1	0	0	1	4
Athletics	12	20	8	40	2
Cycling	1	1	0	2	4
Diving	0	1	0	1	3
Endurance race	1	1	1	3	4
E-Sports	1	2	4	7	4
Gymnastics	9	2	2	13	1
Jujitsu	1	2	9	12	4
Karate	6	1	5	12	1
Kun bokator	6	0	3	9	2
Kun Khmer	5	8	4	17	2
Ouk Chaktrang	2	1	7	10	2
Pencak silat	4	1	9	14	3
Pétanque	0	2	5	7	6
Swimming	7	3	7	17	2
Tennis	0	2	3	5	4
Vovinam	7	12	1	20	2
Arnis	2	2	8	12	4
Billiards	2	3	3	8	2
Boxing	2	1	3	6	3
Xiangqi	2	2	1	5	1
Dancesport	1	1	0	2	1
Fencing	4	3	3	10	2
Finswimming	14	11	5	30	1
Football	1	0	1	2	1
Golf	1	1	1	3	3
Judo	8	1	1	10	1
Kickboxing	4	4	7	15	2
Sepak takraw	1	1	2	4	6
Table tennis	1	1	4	6	3
Taekwondo	4	5	3	12	3
Traditional boat race	3	1	0	4	3
Volleyball	0	1	2	3	3
Weightlifting	4	1	3	8	2
Wrestling	13	4	1	18	1
Wushu	6	3	2	11	3
Total	136	105	118		

== Athletics ==
Men

Athlete	Event	Heats		Final	
Athlete	Event	Time/Height/Mark	Rank	Time/Height/Mark	Rank
Ngần Ngọc Nghĩa	100 m	10.47	2Q	10.46	5
Ngần Ngọc Nghĩa	200 m	20.85	2Q	20.84	2nd place, silver medalist(s)
Trần Nhật Hoàng	400 m	47.68	2Q	48.26	6
Trần Đình Sơn	400 m	47.43	4q	1.01.20	8
Giang Văn Dũng	800 m	1:54:21	2Q	1:54:98	5
Lương Phước Đức	800 m	1:53:08	2Q	1:53:34	2nd place, silver medalist(s)
Giang Văn Dũng	1500 m	—N/a	—N/a	4:05:41	8
Lương Phước Đức	1500 m	—N/a	—N/a	3:59:31	2nd place, silver medalist(s)
Đỗ Quốc Luật	5000 m	—N/a	—N/a	15:17:19	8
Lê Văn Thao	5000 m	—N/a	—N/a	15:37:41	11
Đỗ Quốc Luật	10,000 m	—N/a	—N/a	32:36:32	6
Nguyễn Quốc Anh	10,000 m	—N/a	—N/a	35:05:44	13
Quách Công Lịch	400 m hurdles	53.37	1Q	53.06	6
Nguyễn Đức Sơn	400 m hurdles	57.78	5	Did not advance	
Nguyễn Trung Cường	3000 m steeplechase	—N/a	—N/a	8:51:99	1st place, gold medalist(s)
Lê Tiến Long	3000 m steeplechase	—N/a	—N/a	8:53:62	2nd place, silver medalist(s)
Quách Công Lịch; Trần Nhật Hoàng; Trần Đình Sơn; Nguyễn Tùng Lâm	4 × 400 m relay	—N/a	—N/a	3:09:65	4
Nguyễn Thanh Hoàng	Marathon	—N/a	—N/a	2:35:49	3rd place, bronze medalist(s)
Trịnh Quốc Lương	Marathon	—N/a	—N/a	2:41:36	6
Nguyễn Thành Ngưng	20km race walk	—N/a	—N/a	1:45:36	2nd place, silver medalist(s)
Võ Xuân Vinh	20km race walk	—N/a	—N/a	1:56:15	6
Vũ Đức Anh	High Jump	—N/a	—N/a	2.17m	2nd place, silver medalist(s)
Nguyễn Tiến Trọng	Long Jump	—N/a	—N/a	7.66m	2nd place, silver medalist(s)
Phạm Văn Nghĩa	Long Jump	—N/a	—N/a	7.52m	5
Nguyễn Đức Thương	Triple Jump	—N/a	—N/a	15.66m	4
Trần Văn Điền	Triple Jump	—N/a	—N/a	15.61m	5
Phan Thanh Bình	Shot put	—N/a	—N/a	17.39m	2nd place, silver medalist(s)
Phan Thanh Bình	Discus throw	—N/a	—N/a	48.42m	4
Nguyễn Hoài Văn	Javelin throw	—N/a	—N/a	69.55m	2nd place, silver medalist(s)

Women

Athlete	Event	Heats		Final	
Athlete	Event	Time/Height/Mark	Rank	Time/Height/Mark	Rank
Hoàng Dư Ý	100 m	11.73	4q	11.85	5
Trần Thị Nhi Yến	100 m	11.71	2Q	11.75	3rd place, bronze medalist(s)
Kha Thanh Trúc	200 m	24.15	4Q	24.48	7
Trần Thị Nhi Yến	200 m	25.73	4q	23.54	2nd place, silver medalist(s)
Nguyễn Thị Huyền	400 m	—N/a	—N/a	53.27	2nd place, silver medalist(s)
Nguyễn Thị Hằng	400 m	—N/a	—N/a	53.84	3rd place, bronze medalist(s)
Nguyễn Thị Thu Hà	800 m	—N/a	—N/a	2:08:55	1st place, gold medalist(s)
Bùi Thị Ngân	800 m	—N/a	—N/a	2:08:96	2nd place, silver medalist(s)
Nguyễn Thị Oanh	1500 m	—N/a	—N/a	4:16:85	1st place, gold medalist(s)
Bùi Thị Ngân	1500 m	—N/a	—N/a	4:24:57	2nd place, silver medalist(s)
Nguyễn Thị Oanh	5000 m	—N/a	—N/a	17:00:33	1st place, gold medalist(s)
Phạm Thị Hồng Lệ	5000 m	—N/a	—N/a	17:06:72	2nd place, silver medalist(s)
Nguyễn Thị Oanh	10,000 m	—N/a	—N/a	35:11:53	1st place, gold medalist(s)
Phạm Thị Hồng Lệ	10,000 m	—N/a	—N/a	35:21:09	2nd place, silver medalist(s)
Huỳnh Thị Mỹ Tiên	100 m hurdles	13.50	1Q	13.50	1st place, gold medalist(s)
Bùi Thị Nguyên	100 m hurdles	13.46	1Q	13.52	2nd place, silver medalist(s)
Nguyễn Thị Huyền	400 m hurdles	—N/a	—N/a	56.29	1st place, gold medalist(s)
Nguyễn Thị Ngọc	400 m hurdles	—N/a	—N/a	59.09	3rd place, bronze medalist(s)
Nguyễn Thị Oanh	3000 m steeplechase	—N/a	—N/a	10:34:37	1st place, gold medalist(s)
Nguyễn Thị Hương	3000 m steeplechase	—N/a	—N/a	11:00:85	3rd place, bronze medalist(s)
Hoàng Dư Ý Kha Thanh Trúc; Huỳnh Thị Mỹ Tiên; Lê Tú Chinh	4 × 100 m relay	—N/a	—N/a	44.51	2nd place, silver medalist(s)
Hoàng Thị Minh Hạnh; Nguyễn Thị Hằng; Nguyễn Thị Huyền; Nguyễn Thị Ngọc	4 × 400 m relay	—N/a	—N/a	3:33:05	1st place, gold medalist(s)
Nguyễn Thị Ninh	Marathon	—N/a	—N/a	3:46:44	8
Lê Thị Tuyết	Marathon	—N/a	—N/a	2:49:21	2nd place, silver medalist(s)
Nguyễn Thị Thanh Phúc	20km walk race	—N/a	—N/a	1:55:02	1st place, gold medalist(s)
Nguyễn Thị Vân	20km walk race	—N/a	—N/a	2:15:22	6
Phạm Thị Diễm	High Jump	—N/a	—N/a	1.77m	2nd place, silver medalist(s)
Nguyễn Thanh Vy	High Jump	—N/a	—N/a	1.69m	4
Bùi Thị Thu Thảo	Long Jump	—N/a	—N/a	6.13m	2nd place, silver medalist(s)
Bùi Thị Loan	Long Jump	—N/a	—N/a	6.02m	3rd place, bronze medalist(s)
Nguyễn Thị Hương	Triple Jump	—N/a	—N/a	13.46m	3rd place, bronze medalist(s)
Lê Thị Cẩm Dung	Discus throw	—N/a	—N/a	45.08m	3rd place, bronze medalist(s)
Nguyễn Linh Na	Heptathlon	—N/a	—N/a	5403	1st place, gold medalist(s)
Trần Nhật Hoàng; Nguyễn Thị Hằng; Nguyễn Thị Huyền; Trần Đình Sơn	4 × 400 m mixed relay	—N/a	—N/a	3:21:27	1st place, gold medalist(s)

== Aquathlon ==
Athlete	Event	Final	
Athlete	Event	Time	Rank
Lâm Quang Nhật	Men's individual		
Hoàng Văn Hải	Men's individual		
Vũ Đình Duân	Men's individual		
Nguyễn Thị Kim Tuyến	Women's individual		
Nguyễn Hoàng Dung	Women's individual		
	Mixed Team Relay		

== Badminton ==
Men

Player	Event	Round of 32	Round of 16	Quarter-finals	Semi-finals	Final	Rank
Player	Event	Opponent Score	Opponent Score	Opponent Score	Opponent Score	Opponent Score	Rank
	Singles						
	Doubles	—N/a					
Lê Đức Phát; Nguyễn Đình Hoàng; Nguyễn Hải Đăng; Nguyễn Tiến Tuấn; Nguyễn Xuân Hưng; Phạm Văn Hai; Trần Đình Mạnh	Team	—N/a		Malaysia (MAS); L 1–3	Did not advance		5

Women

Player	Event	Round of 16	Quarter-finals	Semi-finals	Final	Rank
Player	Event	Opponent Score	Opponent Score	Opponent Score	Opponent Score	Rank
	Singles					
	Doubles					
Đinh Thị Phương Hồng; Nguyễn Thùy Linh; Phạm Thị Khánh; Thân Vân Anh; Trần Thị Phương Thùy; Vũ Thị Anh Thư; Vũ Thị Trang	Team	—N/a	Singapore (SGP); L 0–3	Did not advance		5

Mixed

Player	Event	Round of 16	Quarter-finals	Semi-finals	Final	Rank
Player	Event	Opponent Score	Opponent Score	Opponent Score	Opponent Score	Rank
	Doubles					

== Basketball ==
=== Summary ===
Team	Event	Group Stage							Semifinal	Final / BM	
Team	Event	Opposition Score	Opposition Score	Opposition Score	Opposition Score	Opposition Score	Opposition Score	Rank	Opposition Score	Opposition Score	Rank
Vietnam men's	Men's 5x5	Thailand; L 63-104	Laos; W 99-52	Indonesia; L 82-88	—N/a	—N/a	—N/a	3	Malaysia; L 83-94	Did not advance	6
Vietnam women's	Women's 5x5	Indonesia; L 62-67	Thailand; W 75-72	Malaysia; L 72-76	Philippines; L 58-116	Cambodia; W 86-77	Singapore; W 77-55	4	—N/a	—N/a	4
Vietnam men's	Men's 3x3	Indonesia; W 21-18	Philippines; L 13-21	Laos; W 22-11	—N/a	—N/a	—N/a	2Q	Cambodia; L 19-21	Thailand; L 13-21	4
Vietnam women's	Women's 3x3	Philippines W 21-19	Thailand; W 16-13	Laos; W 22-6	—N/a	—N/a	—N/a	1Q	Indonesia; W 21-18	Philippines; W 21-16	1st place, gold medalist(s)

== Boxing ==
Athlete	Event	Preliminaries	Quarterfinals	Semifinals	Final	
Athlete	Event	Opposition Result	Opposition Result	Opposition Result	Opposition Result	Rank
Nguyễn Linh Phụng	Men's 48 kg					
Trần Văn An	Men's 54 kg					
Nguyễn Văn Đương	Men's 57 kg					
Trần Đức Thọ	Men's 67 kg					
Bùi Phước Tùng	Men's 71 kg					
Nguyễn Mạnh Cường	Men's 86 kg					
Đoàn Ngọc Minh Hiếu	Men's +92kg					
Nguyễn Thị Tâm	Women's 54kg					
Hà Thị Linh	Women's 63kg					
Nguyễn Thị Phương Hoài	Women's 75kg					

== Cycling ==
=== Mountain biking ===
Athlete	Event	Qualification		Final	
Athlete	Event	Time	Rank	Time	Rank
Bùi Văn Nhật	Men's cross-country				
Nguyễn Văn Lâm	Men's cross-country				
Phạm Minh Đạt	Men's cross-country				
Đinh Thị Như Quỳnh	Women's cross-country				
Cà Thị Thơm	Women's cross-country				

== Duathlon ==
Athlete	Event	Final	
Athlete	Event	Time	Rank
Phạm Tiến Sản	Men's individual		
Hà Văn Nhật	Men's individual		
Nguyễn Thị Thúy Vân	Women's individual		
Nguyễn Thị Phương Trinh	Women's individual		

== Esports ==
Team	Event	Group Stage				Semifinal	Final	
Team	Event	Opposition Score	Opposition Score	Opposition Score	Rank	Opposition Score	Opposition Score	Rank
Vietnam Mixed	League of Legends : Wild Rift (Mobile)	—N/a	—N/a	—N/a	—N/a	Cambodia		

== Fencing ==
=== Men's ===
Athlete	Event	Preliminaries Pool		Round of 16	Quarterfinals	Semifinals	Finals	
Athlete	Event	Opposition Score	Rank	Opposition Score	Opposition Score	Opposition Score	Opposition Score	Rank
Nguyễn Tiến Nhật	Individual épée	S Saknut (CAM); W 5–0	1Q	Bye	Nguyễn Phước Đền (VIE); W 15–11	Jian Tong Sito (SGP); L 12–15	—N/a	3rd place, bronze medalist(s)
Nguyễn Tiến Nhật	Individual épée	N Kadafie (INA); W 5–0	1Q	Bye	Nguyễn Phước Đền (VIE); W 15–11	Jian Tong Sito (SGP); L 12–15	—N/a	3rd place, bronze medalist(s)
Nguyễn Tiến Nhật	Individual épée	I Xuan (MAS); W 5–0	1Q	Bye	Nguyễn Phước Đền (VIE); W 15–11	Jian Tong Sito (SGP); L 12–15	—N/a	3rd place, bronze medalist(s)
Nguyễn Tiến Nhật	Individual épée	L Ergina (PHI); W 5–0	1Q	Bye	Nguyễn Phước Đền (VIE); W 15–11	Jian Tong Sito (SGP); L 12–15	—N/a	3rd place, bronze medalist(s)
Nguyễn Tiến Nhật	Individual épée	S LEE (SGP); W 5–0	1Q	Bye	Nguyễn Phước Đền (VIE); W 15–11	Jian Tong Sito (SGP); L 12–15	—N/a	3rd place, bronze medalist(s)
Nguyễn Tiến Nhật	Individual épée	N Singkham (THA); L 3–5	1Q	Bye	Nguyễn Phước Đền (VIE); W 15–11	Jian Tong Sito (SGP); L 12–15	—N/a	3rd place, bronze medalist(s)
Nguyễn Phước Đền	Individual épée	V Paul (CAM); W 5–2	4Q	Korakote Juengamnuaychai (THA); W 15–12	Nguyễn Tiến Nhật (VIE); L 11–15	Did not advance		
Nguyễn Phước Đền	Individual épée	A Williansyah (INA); W 5–0	4Q	Korakote Juengamnuaychai (THA); W 15–12	Nguyễn Tiến Nhật (VIE); L 11–15	Did not advance		
Nguyễn Phước Đền	Individual épée	K Jie (MAS); L 1–5	4Q	Korakote Juengamnuaychai (THA); W 15–12	Nguyễn Tiến Nhật (VIE); L 11–15	Did not advance		
Nguyễn Phước Đền	Individual épée	N Joe (PHI); W 5–4	4Q	Korakote Juengamnuaychai (THA); W 15–12	Nguyễn Tiến Nhật (VIE); L 11–15	Did not advance		
Nguyễn Phước Đền	Individual épée	J Sito (SGP); L 3–5	4Q	Korakote Juengamnuaychai (THA); W 15–12	Nguyễn Tiến Nhật (VIE); L 11–15	Did not advance		
Nguyễn Phước Đền	Individual épée	K Juengamnuaychai (THA); L 2–5	4Q	Korakote Juengamnuaychai (THA); W 15–12	Nguyễn Tiến Nhật (VIE); L 11–15	Did not advance		

== Football ==
Summary

Key:

- A.E.T – After extra time.
- P – Match decided by penalty-shootout.

Team	Event	Group Stage					Semifinal	Final / BM	
Team	Event	Opposition Score	Opposition Score	Opposition Score	Opposition Score	Rank	Opposition Score	Opposition Score	Rank
Vietnam men's	Men's tournament	Laos; W 2–0	Singapore; W 3–1	Malaysia; W 2–1	Thailand; D 1–1	2 Q	Indonesia; L 2–3	Myanmar; W 3–1	3rd place, bronze medalist(s)
Vietnam women's	Women's tournament	Malaysia; W 3–0	Myanmar; W 3–1	Philippines; L 1–2	—N/a	1 Q	Cambodia; W 4–0	Myanmar; W 2–0	1st place, gold medalist(s)

=== Men's tournament ===
Team roster

Head coach: (France) Philippe Troussier

The final squad was announced on 29 April 2023.

No.	Pos.	Player	Date of birth (age)	Club
1	GK	Quan Văn Chuẩn (captain)	7 January 2001 (age 25)	(Vietnam Football Federation) Hà Nội
2	DF	Phan Tuấn Tài	7 January 2001 (age 25)	(Vietnam Football Federation) Viettel
3	DF	Lương Duy Cương	7 November 2001 (age 24)	(Vietnam Football Federation) SHB Đà Nẵng
4	DF	Trần Quang Thịnh	12 May 2001 (age 25)	(Vietnam Football Federation) Công An Hà Nội
5	DF	Nguyễn Ngọc Thắng	31 January 2002 (age 24)	(Vietnam Football Federation) Hồng Lĩnh Hà Tĩnh
6	DF	Vũ Tiến Long	4 April 2002 (age 24)	(Vietnam Football Federation) Hà Nội
7	MF	Lê Văn Đô	7 August 2001 (age 24)	(Vietnam Football Federation) Công An Hà Nội
8	MF	Khuất Văn Khang	11 May 2003 (age 23)	(Vietnam Football Federation) Viettel
9	FW	Nguyễn Văn Tùng	7 December 2001 (age 24)	(Vietnam Football Federation) Hà Nội
10	MF	Đinh Xuân Tiến	10 January 2003 (age 23)	(Vietnam Football Federation) Sông Lam Nghệ An
11	FW	Nguyễn Thanh Nhàn	28 July 2003 (age 22)	(Vietnam Football Federation) PVF-CAND
12	MF	Nguyễn Thái Sơn	13 July 2003 (age 22)	(Vietnam Football Federation) Thanh Hóa
13	DF	Hồ Văn Cường	15 January 2003 (age 23)	(Vietnam Football Federation) Sông Lam Nghệ An
14	FW	Nguyễn Văn Trường	10 September 2003 (age 22)	(Vietnam Football Federation) Hà Nội
15	MF	Huỳnh Công Đến	19 August 2001 (age 24)	(Vietnam Football Federation) PVF-CAND
16	MF	Lê Quốc Nhật Nam	23 March 2001 (age 25)	(Vietnam Football Federation) Huế
17	DF	Võ Minh Trọng	24 October 2001 (age 24)	(Vietnam Football Federation) Đồng Tháp
18	MF	Nguyễn Đức Phú	13 January 2003 (age 23)	(Vietnam Football Federation) PVF-CAND
19	FW	Nguyễn Quốc Việt	4 May 2003 (age 23)	(Vietnam Football Federation) Hoàng Anh Gia Lai
20	GK	Đoàn Huy Hoàng	18 June 2003 (age 23)	(Vietnam Football Federation) Viettel

Group play

Pos	Team	Pld	W	D	L	GF	GA	GD	Pts	Qualification
1	Thailand	4	3	1	0	10	3	+7	10	Advance to Semi-finals
2	Vietnam	4	3	1	0	8	3	+5	10	Advance to Semi-finals
3	Malaysia	4	2	0	2	13	5	+8	6	
4	Laos	4	0	1	3	2	11	−9	1	
5	Singapore	4	0	1	3	2	13	−11	1	

Source: FIFA
30 April 2023
19:00

Vietnam	2–0	Laos
Nguyễn Văn Tùng 2'; Nguyễn Quốc Việt 90+2'	Report

Visakha Stadium, Phnom Penh
Attendance: 3,925
Referee: Ouseyha Khin (Cambodia)
3 May 2023
16:00

Singapore	1–3	Vietnam
Vũ Tiến Long 90+4' (o.g.)	Report	Văn Tùng 35'; Nguyễn Thái Sơn 43'; Noor 79' (o.g.)

Visakha Stadium, Phnom Penh
Attendance: 4,062
Referee: Shen Yinhao (China)
8 May 2023
19:00

Malaysia	1–2	Vietnam
Aliff 43'	Report	Nguyễn Văn Tùng 6', 33'

Visakha Stadium, Phnom Penh
Attendance: 3,558
Referee: Jumpei Iida (Japan)
11 May 2023
19:00

Vietnam	1-1	Thailand
Lê Quốc Nhật Nam 43'	Report	Achitpol 2'

Visakha Stadium, Phnom Penh
Attendance: 5,402
Referee: Ammar Ashkanani (Kuwait)

Semi-final

13 May 2023
16:00

Indonesia	3–2	Vietnam
Komang 9'; Ferarri 53'; Taufany 90+6'	Report	Nguyễn Văn Tùng 36'; Bagas 79' (o.g.)

Olympic Stadium, Phnom Penh
Attendance: 7,864
Referee: Kim Hee-gon (South Korea)

Bronze medal match

16 May 2023
16:00

Vietnam	3–1	Myanmar
Hồ Văn Cường 8', 34'; Khuất Văn Khang 56'	Report	Aung Myo Khant 88'

Olympic Stadium, Phnom Penh
Attendance: 10,829
Referee: Hassan Akrami (Iran)

=== Women's tournament ===
Group play

Pos	Team	Pld	W	D	L	GF	GA	GD	Pts	Qualification
1	Vietnam	3	2	0	1	7	3	+4	6	Advance to Semi-finals
2	Myanmar	3	2	0	1	7	4	+3	6	Advance to Semi-finals
3	Philippines	3	2	0	1	3	2	+1	6	
4	Malaysia	3	0	0	3	1	9	−8	0	
5	Indonesia	0	0	0	0	0	0	0	0	Withdrew

Source: FIFA
3 May 2023
15:30

Vietnam	3–0	Malaysia
Phạm Hải Yến 5'; Nguyễn Thị Bích Thùy 24'; Jaciah 34' (o.g.)

RCAF Old Stadium, Phnom Penh
Attendance: 1,806

6 May 2023
16:00

Myanmar	1–3	Vietnam
Naw Htet Htet Wai 42'		Huỳnh Như 10'; Nguyễn Thị Thanh Nhã 76'; Trần Thị Thùy Trang 89'

RCAF Old Stadium, Phnom Penh
Attendance: 1,568

9 May 2023
16:00

Vietnam	1–2	Philippines
Nguyễn Thị Bích Thùy 40'		Bolden 12' (pen.); Long 82'

RSN Stadium, Phnom Penh
Attendance: 1,658

Semi-final

12 May 2023
19:00

Vietnam	4–0	Cambodia
Ngân Thị Vạn Sự 20'; Phạm Hải Yến 30'; Trần Thị Thùy Trang 36' (pen.); Huỳnh Như 90+3' (pen.)

Olympic Stadium, Phnom Penh
Attendance: 9,849
Referee: Mahnaz Zokaee (Iran)

Gold medal match

15 May 2023
19:30

Vietnam	2–0	Myanmar
Huỳnh Như 12'; Nguyễn Thị Thanh Nhã 75'

Olympic Stadium, Phnom Penh
Attendance: 5,063
Referee: Plong Pichakara (Cambodia)

== Golf ==
=== Individual ===
Athlete	Event	Round 1			Round 2			Final Round		
Athlete	Event	Score	To par	Rank	Score	To par	Rank	Score	To par	Rank
Lê Khánh Hưng	Men's	69	-3	2	65	-10	1	69	-13	1st place, gold medalist(s)
Nguyễn Anh Minh	Men's	70	-2	3	69	-5	5	68	-9	3rd place, bronze medalist(s)
Nguyễn Đặng Minh	Men's	72	0	8	69	-3	7	70	-5	10
Đoàn Uy	Men's	78	+6	26	72	+6	24	72	+6	23
Đoàn Xuân Khuê Minh	Women's	77	+5	16	74	+7	14	74	+9	16
Lê Chúc An	Women's	79	+7	19	76	+11	19	77	+16	19
Thân Bảo Nghi	Women's	81	+9	20	76	+13	20	86	+27	20

=== Team ===
Athlete	Event	Quarterfinals	Semifinals	Final / BM	
Athlete	Event	Opposition Score	Opposition Score	Opposition Score	Rank
Lê Khánh Hưng; Nguyễn Anh Minh; Đoàn Uy	Men's	Laos; W 3-0	Indonesia; W 2–1	Thailand; L 1–2	2nd place, silver medalist(s)
Đoàn Xuân Minh Khuê; Lê Chúc An	Women's	Thailand; L 0-2	Did not advance		

== Gymnastics ==
=== All-around ===
Athlete	Event	Floor (gymnastics)		Pommel horse		Rings (gymnastics)		Vault (gymnastics)		Parallel bars		Horizontal bar		Total All-Around	
Athlete	Event	Score	Rank	Score	Rank	Score	Rank	Score	Rank	Score	Rank	Score	Rank	Score	Rank
Lê Thanh Tùng	Individual all-around	13.500		12.700		13.200		11.550		13.900		13.400		78.250	2nd place, silver medalist(s)
Đinh Phương Thành	Individual all-around	12.400		13.250		11.200		13.250		14.530		13.500		78.130	3rd place, bronze medalist(s)
Văn Vĩ Lương	Individual all-around	12.300		10.400		12.950		14.050		12.650		10.150		72.500	8
Trịnh Hải Khang	Individual all-around	13.200		—N/a		11.750		14.700		13.500		11.500		64.650	14
Nguyễn Văn Khánh Phong	Individual all-around	—N/a		11.350		14.050		13.800		—N/a				39.200	22
Đặng Ngọc Xuân Thiện	Individual all-around	—N/a		12.900		—N/a								12.900	31
Total	Team all-around	51.400	2	50.400	1	51.950	1	56.100	2	54.600	1	48.550	1	313.000	1st place, gold medalist(s)

=== Apparatus Finals ===
Athlete	Floor (gymnastics)		Pommel horse		Rings (gymnastics)		Vault (gymnastics)		Parallel bars		Horizontal bar	
Athlete	Score	Rank	Score	Rank	Score	Rank	Score	Rank	Score	Rank	Score	Rank
Lê Thanh Tùng	12.350	5	—N/a									
Đinh Phương Thành	—N/a								14.400	2nd place, silver medalist(s)	13.500	1st place, gold medalist(s)
Đặng Ngọc Xuân Thiện	—N/a		13.450	1st place, gold medalist(s)	—N/a							
Nguyễn Văn Khánh Phong	—N/a				14.200	1st place, gold medalist(s)	—N/a					
Trịnh Hải Khang	—N/a						14.050	3rd place, bronze medalist(s)	—N/a			

=== Aerobic ===
Athlete	Event	Preliminaries		Final	
Athlete	Event	Score	Rank	Score	Rank
Phan Thế Gia Hiển	Men's individual	—N/a	—N/a	19.450	1st place, gold medalist(s)
Hà Trần Vi	Women's individual	—N/a	—N/a	18.3660	1st place, gold medalist(s)
Lê Hoàng Phong; Trần Ngọc Thúy Vi	Mixed pair	—N/a	—N/a	19.233	1st place, gold medalist(s)
Hoàng Gia Bảo; Lê Hoàng Phong; Nguyễn Chế Thanh	Mixed Trio	—N/a	—N/a	19.2670	1st place, gold medalist(s)
Vương Hoài An; Lê Hoàng Phong; Nguyễn Chế Thanh; Trần Ngọc Thúy Vi; Nguyễn Việt Anh	Mixed Group	—N/a	—N/a	19.611	1st place, gold medalist(s)

== Jujitsu ==
=== Duo ===
Athlete	Event	Pool Stage			
Athlete	Event	Opposition Score	Opposition Score	Opposition Score	Rank
Ma Đình Khải; Trịnh Kế Dương	Men's duo	Panuawat Deeyatam; Nawin Kokaew (THA); L 64.5-65.5	Kongmona Mithora; Touch Pikada (CAM); L 63-66	Jan Harvey Navarro; Karl Dale Navarro (PHI); W 64-59	3rd place, bronze medalist(s)
Hoàng Lan Hương; Nguyễn Minh Phương	Women's duo				

=== Ne-waza ===
Athlete	Event	Pool Stage				Final / BM	
Athlete	Event	Opposition Score	Opposition Score	Opposition Score	Opposition Score	Opposition Score	Rank
Cấn Văn Thắng	Men's ne-waza gi 62 kg	Mendina (PHI)					
Nguyễn Hữu Khang	Men's ne-waza gi 69 kg						
Đặng Thị Huyền	Women's ne-waza gi 52 kg	May Yong Teh (SGP); W 50–0	Nuchanat Singchalad (THA); L 0-6	Kaila Napolis (PHI); L 0-50	Jessa Khan (CAM); L 0-50	—N/a	3rd place, bronze medalist(s)
Lê Thị Thương	Women's ne-waza nogi 57 kg						

=== Show ===
Athlete	Event	Score	Rank
Nguyễn Minh Phương; Hoàng Thị Lan Hương	Women's show	40	3rd place, bronze medalist(s)
Phạm Hữu Thắng; Nguyễn Văn Đức	Men's show		

== Judo ==
=== Men's combat ===
Athlete	Event	Round Robin				Round of 16	Quarterfinals	Semifinals	Final	
Athlete	Event	Opposition Score	Opposition Score	Opposition Score	Opposition Score	Opposition Score	Opposition Score	Opposition Score	Opposition Score	Rank
Nguyễn Hoàng Thanh	–55 kg	—N/a				Bye	Reza (INA); W 100–0	Chanthaphone (LAO); W 100–0	Suksai (THA); W 100–0	1st place, gold medalist(s)
Chu Đức Đạt	–60 kg	—N/a				Bye	Bye	Long (MYA); W 100–0	Sithisane (LAO); W 100–20	1st place, gold medalist(s)
Lê Anh Tài	–90 kg	—N/a				Bye	Sayasane (LAO); W 100–0	NG (SGP); W 100–0	Puyang (THA); W 120–10	1st place, gold medalist(s)

=== Woman's combat ===
Athlete	Event	Round Robin				Round of 16	Quarterfinals	Semifinals	Final / BM	
Athlete	Event	Opposition Score	Opposition Score	Opposition Score	Opposition Score	Opposition Score	Opposition Score	Opposition Score	Opposition Score	Rank
Nguyễn Nhạc Như An	–44 kg	—N/a				Bye	Lopez (PHI); W 100–20	Aulia (INA); W 100–20	Kesone Ouanvilay (LAO); W 100–0	1st place, gold medalist(s)
Hoàng Thị Tình	–48 kg	—N/a				Bye	Bye	Lopez (PHI); W 120–30	Muenjit (THA); W 110–20	1st place, gold medalist(s)
Nguyễn Thị Thanh Thủy	–52 kg	—N/a				Bye	Le (MAS); W 110–10	Su (MYA); W 120–30	Yanagiha (CAM); W 20GS–20	1st place, gold medalist(s)
Lê Ngọc Diễm Phương	–57 kg	—N/a				Bye	Dalin (CAM); W 110–10	Furukawa (PHI); L 30–120	Segaran (MAS); W 120–30	3rd place, bronze medalist(s)

=== Mixed combat ===
Athlete	Event	Round Robin				Round of 16	Quarterfinals	Semifinals	Final / BM	
Athlete	Event	Opposition Score	Opposition Score	Opposition Score	Opposition Score	Opposition Score	Opposition Score	Opposition Score	Opposition Score	Rank
Dương Thanh Thanh; Lê Anh Tài; Lê Huỳnh Tường Vi; Nguyễn Châu Hoàng Lân; Nguyễn Hải Bá; Nguyễn Thị Bích Ngọc	Mixed Team	—N/a				Bye	Carl Dave Aseneta; John Viron Ferrer; Rena Furukawa; Dylwynn Gimena; Keisei Nakano; Ryoko Salinas (PHI); W 4–1	Dewa Ayu Mira Widari; Gede Agastya Darma Wardana; Komang Ardiarta; Maryam March Maharani; Qori Amrullah Al Haq Nugraha; Syerina (INA); W 4–3	Wanwisa Muenjit; Supattra Nanong; Ikumi Oeda; Surasak Puntanam; Masayuki Terada; Wei Puyang (THA); W 4–3	1st place, gold medalist(s)

=== Kata ===
Athlete	Event	Preliminaries		Final	
Athlete	Event	Score	Rank	Score	Rank
Nguyễn Cường Thịnh; Tạ Đức Huy	Kime no Kata	483.000	1	528.500	1st place, gold medalist(s)
Nguyễn Bảo Ngọc; Trần Lê Phương Nga	Ju no Kata	406.000	2	401.000	2nd place, silver medalist(s)

== Karate ==
Kata

Athlete	Event	Round 1		Semifinals		Finals	
Athlete	Event	Opposition Score	Rank	Opposition Score	Rank	Opposition Score	Rank
Phạm Minh Đức	Men's individual						
Phạm Minh Đức; Lê Hồng Phúc; Giang Việt Anh	Men's team						
Nguyễn Thị Phương	Women's individual						
Nguyễn Ngọc Trâm; Lưu Thị Thu Uyên; Minh Phương	Women's team						

== Kun Bokator ==
Athlete	Event	Quarterfinals	Semi-finals	Finals	
Athlete	Event	Opoosition Score	Opoosition Score	Opoosition Score	Rank
Nguyễn Quang Luân	Men's 50kg				
Hoàng Phúc Thuận	Men's 55kg				
Đặng Văn Thắng	Men's 60kg				
Huỳnh Văn Cường	Men's 65kg				
Ngô Đức Mạnh	Men's 70kg				
Phạm Thị Phượng	Women's 45kg				
Nguyễn Thị Thanh Tiền	Women's 50kg				
Nguyễn Thị Tuyết Mai	Women's 55kg				
Trần Võ Song Thương	Women's 60kg				

== Kun Khmer ==
Athlete	Event	Quarterfinals	Semi-finals	Finals	
Athlete	Event	Opoosition Score	Opoosition Score	Opoosition Score	Rank
Đỗ Anh Quân	Men's Kun Kru	—N/a	—N/a		
Võ Nhuận Phong	Men's 45kg	—N/a	—N/a		
Dương Đức Bảo	Men's 48kg	—N/a	Haiqal Bin (MAS)		
Lê Công Nghi	Men's 51kg	—N/a	Muhamad Adam (MAS)		
Khuất Văn Khải	Men's 54kg	Angcaway (PHI)			
	Men's 57kg	—N/a	TBA (CAM)		
Nguyễn Doãn Long	Men's 60kg	Attaxay (LAO)			
Trương Cao Minh Phát	Men's 63.5kg	—N/a	Khun Bora (CAM)		
Nguyễn Châu Đạt	Men's 67kg	Hlian (MYA)			
	Men's 71kg	Lim chun (MAS)			
	Men's 75kg	—N/a	TBA (MYA)		
Nguyễn Văn Chiến	Men's 81kg	—N/a	Tun Tun Min (MYA)		
Phạm Thị Bích Liểu	Women's Kun Kru	—N/a	—N/a		
Huỳnh Hà Hữu Hiếu	Women's 45kg	—N/a	Chha Chandeng (CAM)		
Triệu Thị Phương Thuý	Women's 51kg	—N/a	Mar Yie Nar (MYA)		

== Ouk Chaktrang ==
Athlete	Event	Group Stage							Semifinal	Final	
Athlete	Event	Opposition Score	Opposition Score	Opposition Score	Opposition Score	Opposition Score	Opposition Score	Rank	Opposition Score	Opposition Score	Rank
Nguyễn Quang Trung	Men's singles 5-Minute	Heuangbotsy (LAO); W 1-0	Naing Myo Lin (MYA); W 1-0	Limheng (CAM); L 0-1	Gatos (PHI); W 1-0	Tupfah (THA); W 1-0	—N/a	2 Q			
Hoàng Nam Thắng	Men's singles 5-Minute	Senglek (LAO); W 1-0	Aung (MYA); W 1-0	Chanphanit (CAM); L 0-1	Young (PHI); W 1-0	Meechai (THA); W 1-0	—N/a	2 Q			
Võ Thanh Ninh	Men's singles 60-Minute	Arunnuntapanich (THA); W 1-0	Aung (MYA); W 1-0	Wen (MAS)							
Khoa Bảo	Men's singles 60-Minute	Saeheng (THA); L 0-1	Htun (MYA); W 1-0								
Đoàn Thị Hồng Nhung	Women's singles 60-Minute	Mendoza (PHI); L 0-1	Phonesavanh (LAO); W 1-0	Khaing (MYA); W 1-0	Sokratha (CAM); W 1-0						
Vũ Thị Diệu Uyên	Women's singles 60-Minute	Narciso (PHI); W 1-0	Maly (LAO); W 1-0	Hlaing (MYA); W 1-0	Khemrareaksmey (CAM); W 1-0						
Nguyễn Quang Trung; Phan Trọng Bình	Men's doubles 60-Minute	Bunmalyka/ Leang (CAM); L 0-1	Garcia/ Bersamina (PHI); L 0-1								
Dương Thế Anh; Trần Quốc Dũng; Hoàng Nam Thắng	Men's triples 60-Minute	Philippines; W 2.5-0.5	Cambodia; L 0.5-2.5	Thailand; L 0-3	Myanmar; D 1.5-1.5	Malaysia					
Khoa Bảo; Trần Quốc Dũng; Võ Thanh Ninh; Dương Thế Anh	Men's Quadruples 60-Minute	Philippines; W 3.5-0.5	Myanmar; D 2-2	Cambodia; D 2-2	Thailand	—N/a	—N/a				
Tôn Nữ Hồng Ân; Phạm Thanh Phương Thảo	Women's doubles 60-Minute	Khemrareaksmay / Sokratha (CAM); W 2-0	Hlaing / Khaing (MYA); W 1.5-0.5	Jia / Faiqah (MAS); W 2-0	Sarocha/ Sirikan (THA); W 1.5-0.5	Frayna/ Mendoza (PHI); W 1.5-0.5	Phonesavanh/ Maly (LAO)		—N/a	—N/a	1st place, gold medalist(s)

== Pencak Silat ==
Athlete	Event	Round of 32	Round of 16	Quarterfinals	Semi-finals	Finals	Rank
Athlete	Event	Opoosition Score	Opoosition Score	Opoosition Score	Opoosition Score	Opoosition Score	Rank
Phạm Hải Tiến	Men's Artistic Tunggal (Single)	—N/a	Bye				
Vương Thị Bình	Women's Artistic Tunggal (Single)	—N/a	—N/a	Bunnary (CAM)			
Nguyễn Phương Linh; Dương Thùy Linh; Triệu Thị Hoài	Women's Artistic Tunggal (Team)	—N/a	—N/a	Singapore			

== Pétanque ==
=== Men's ===
Athlete	Event	Group Stage						Semifinals	Final / BM	
Athlete	Event	Opposition Score	Opposition Score	Opposition Score	Opposition Score	Opposition Score	Rank	Opposition Score	Opposition Score	Rank
Nguyễn Văn Hào Em	Singles	S Chanmean (CAM); L 2–13	B Southammavong (LAO); L 10–12	S Musmin (MAS); L 6–13	J Bon (PHI); L 8–11	A Meekhong (THA); L 9–13	6	Did not advance	Did not advance	
Ngô Ron; Danh Sà Phanl	Doubles	M Faizal / M Zaki (MAS); W 13–1	D Laureno / M Onrubia (PHI); W 13–6	—N/a			1 Q	A Kaewla/ R Khamdee (THA); L 5–13	—N/a	3rd place, bronze medalist(s)
Huỳnh Phước Nguyên; Huỳnh Thiên Ân; Thạch Tuấn Thanh; Võ Minh Luân	Triples	A Aziz / M Yahya / M Ali / W Yassin (BRU); W 13–1	P Lanvongheng / K Phetvaly / K Ounnalom / M Viphakon (LAO); W 13–10	A Masumbol / B Hortilano / R Anajao / R Fuentes (PHI); W 13–0	—N/a		1 Q	B Sidaet/ H Than/ K Sopheaktra/ T Nora (CAM); L 10–13	—N/a	3rd place, bronze medalist(s)
Nguyễn Văn Dũng	Shooting	34 Rank 5	37 Rank 2	—N/a			Q	T Chhoeun (CAM); L 25–34	—N/a	3rd place, bronze medalist(s)

== Sailing ==
=== Men's ===
Athlete	Event	Race														Total points	Nett points	Final rank
Athlete	Event	1	2	3	4	5	6	7	8	9	10	11	12	13	MR	Total points	Nett points	Final rank
Bùi Tuấn Anh	ILCA7	~~6~~	6	6	5	6	6	4	4	5	6	—N/a	—N/a	—N/a	14 DNC	68	62	6

=== Women's ===
Athlete	Event	Race													Total points	Net points	Final rank
Athlete	Event	1	2	3	4	5	6	7	8	9	10	11	12	13	Total points	Net points	Final rank
Nguyễn Thị Mỹ Hạnh	ILCA6	4	4	4	~~5~~	5	5								27	22	4

=== Mixed ===
Athlete	Event	Race													Total points	Net points	Final rank
Athlete	Event	1	2	3	4	5	6	7	8	9	10	11	12	13	Total points	Net points	Final rank
Bùi Nguyễn Lệ Hằng	ILCA4	5	5	~~6~~	6	4	4								30	24	5
Phạm Văn Mách; Tạ Bá Trọng	29er	5	4	4	4	~~6 DNF~~	6 DNF	5							34	28	4

== Swimming ==
=== Men's ===
Athlete	Event	Heats		Final	
Athlete	Event	Time	Rank	Time	Rank
Mai Trần Tuấn Anh	50 m backstroke	27.25	5	Did not advance	
Mai Trần Tuấn Anh	100 m backstroke	58.19	5Q	57.64	7
Luong Jérémie Loïc Nino	50 m freestyle	23.20	1Q	22.84	3rd place, bronze medalist(s)
Luong Jérémie Loïc Nino	50 m butterfly	24.33	3Q	24.36	6
Luong Jérémie Loïc Nino	100 m freestyle	51.44	2Q	49.69	3rd place, bronze medalist(s)
Nguyễn Hoàng Khang	50 m freestyle	23.85	4	Did not advance	
Nguyễn Hoàng Khang	50 m butterfly	24.21	2Q	23.98	4
Cao Văn Dũng	100 m backstroke	57.97	3Q	57.20	6
Cao Văn Dũng	200 m backstroke	2:09.06	3Q	2:02.86	4
Hoàng Quý Phước	100 m freestyle	51.69	4	Did not advance	
Lê Trọng Phúc	50 m breaststroke	30.50	6	Did not advance	
Lê Thành Được	100 m breaststroke	1:05.01	5	Did not advance	
Lê Thành Được	200 m breaststroke	2:20.26	2Q	2:18.22	6
Phạm Thanh Bảo	50 m breaststroke	28.54	1Q	28.39	5
Phạm Thanh Bảo	100 m breaststroke	1:02.72	2Q	1:00.97 GR	1st place, gold medalist(s)
Phạm Thanh Bảo	200 m breaststroke	2:18.48	1Q	2:11.45 GR	1st place, gold medalist(s)
Nguyễn Viết Tường	100 m butterfly	55.90	6	Did not advance	
Hồ Nguyễn Duy Khoa	100 m butterfly	55.44	5	Did not advance	
Hồ Nguyễn Duy Khoa	200 m butterfly	2:05.39	3Q	2:00.60	3rd place, bronze medalist(s)
Ngô Đình Chuyển	200 m freestyle	1:52.50	3Q	1:51.91	7
Nguyễn Quang Thuấn	200 m individual medley	2:05.95	2Q	2:03.15	4
Nguyễn Quang Thuấn	400 m individual medley	—N/a	—N/a	4:21.03	2nd place, silver medalist(s)
Trần Hưng Nguyên	200 m backstroke	2:06.99	1Q	2:01.34	2nd place, silver medalist(s)
Trần Hưng Nguyên	200 m individual medley	2:07.18	1Q	2:01.28	1st place, gold medalist(s)
Trần Hưng Nguyên	400 m individual medley	—N/a	—N/a	4:19.12	1st place, gold medalist(s)
Nguyễn Huy Hoàng	200 m freestyle	1:51.94	1Q	1:49.31	3rd place, bronze medalist(s)
Nguyễn Huy Hoàng	200 m butterfly	2:05.38	2Q	2:01.28	4
Nguyễn Huy Hoàng	400 m freestyle	3:57.00	1Q	3:49.50	1st place, gold medalist(s)
Nguyễn Huy Hoàng	1500 m freestyle	15:11.24	1Q	15:11.21	1st place, gold medalist(s)
Nguyễn Hữu Kim Sơn	1500 m freestyle	15:35.21	2Q	15:35.21	2nd place, silver medalist(s)
Đỗ Ngọc Vinh	400 m freestyle	3:59.51	2Q	3:56.26	4
Trần Hưng Nguyên; Ngô Đình Chuyền; Hoàng Quý Phước; Luong Jérémie Loïc Nino	4 × 100 m freestyle relay	—N/a	—N/a	3:21.09	3rd place, bronze medalist(s)
Trần Hưng Nguyên; Nguyễn Hữu Kim Sơn; Hoàng Quý Phước; Nguyễn Huy Hoàng	4 × 200 m freestyle relay	—N/a	—N/a	7:18.51	1st place, gold medalist(s)
Luong Jérémie Loïc Nino; Phạm Thanh Bảo; Hoàng Quý Phước; Cao Văn Dũng	4 × 100 m medley relay	—N/a	—N/a	3:41.98	4

=== Women's ===
Athlete	Event	Heats		Final	
Athlete	Event	Time	Rank	Time	Rank
Lê Quỳnh Như	50 m backstroke	30.95	5	Did not advance	
Lê Quỳnh Như	100 m backstroke	1:09.05	5	Did not advance	
Nguyễn Thúy Hiền	50 m butterfly	28.41	5Q	28.24	7
Nguyễn Thúy Hiền	50 m freestyle	26.70	5Q	26.27	7
Nguyễn Thúy Hiền	50 m breaststroke	33.11	3Q	32.70	6
Nguyễn Thúy Hiền	100 m freestyle	56.88	1Q	56.42	3rd place, bronze medalist(s)
Nguyễn Thúy Hiền	200 m freestyle	2:07.34	2Q	2:07.17	6
Phạm Thị Vân	50 m backstroke	30.98	6	Did not advance	
Phạm Thị Vân	50 m freestyle	26.49	3Q	26.13	6
Phạm Thị Vân	50 m butterfly	28.00	4Q	27.69	6
Phạm Thị Vân	100 m freestyle	58.34	2Q	57.05	4
Phạm Thị Vân	100 m butterfly	1:03.73	4	Did not advance	
Lê Thu Thuý	400 m freestyle	4:33.32	3Q	4:32.97	7
Võ Thị Mỹ Tiên	200 m butterfly	—N/a	—N/a	2:18.18	5
Võ Thị Mỹ Tiên	400 m freestyle	4:27.74	2Q	4:21.79	3rd place, bronze medalist(s)
Võ Thị Mỹ Tiên	800 m freestyle	8:56.07	3Q	8:56.62	3rd place, bronze medalist(s)
Lê Quỳnh Như; Võ Thị Mỹ Tiên; Phạm Thị Vân; Nguyễn Thúy Hiền	4 × 100 m freestyle relay	—N/a	—N/a	Did not qualify	
Lê Thu Thúy; Võ Thị Mỹ Tiên; Phạm Thị Vân; Nguyễn Thúy Hiền	4 × 200 m freestyle relay	—N/a	—N/a	8:27.22	4
Lê Quỳnh Như; Võ Thị Mỹ Tiên; Phạm Thị Vân; Nguyễn Thúy Hiền	4 × 100 m medley relay	—N/a	—N/a	4:24.33	5

=== Mixed ===
Athlete	Event	Heats		Final	
Athlete	Event	Time	Rank	Time	Rank
Lê Quỳnh Như; Võ Thị Mỹ Tiên; Lê Trọng Phúc; Nguyễn Viết Tường	4 × 100 m medley relay	—N/a	—N/a	4:06.42	6

== Triathlon ==
Athlete	Event	Final	
Athlete	Event	Time	Rank
Lâm Quang Nhật	Men's individual		
Nguyễn Thị Kim Cương	Women's individual		

== Volleyball ==
=== Indoor ===
Team	Event	Preliminary round				Semi Finals / PF	Finals / BM / PF	
Team	Event	Opposition Score	Opposition Score	Opposition Score	Rank	Opposition Score	Opposition Score	Rank
Vietnam men's	Men's tournament	Myanmar; W 3–0	Thailand; L 1–3	Malaysia; W 3–0	2nd	Indonesia; L 0–3	Thailand; W 3–0	3rd place, bronze medalist(s)
Vietnam women's	Women's tournament	Singapore; W 3–0	Philippines; W 3–0	Cambodia; W 3–0	1st	Indonesia; W 3–2	Thailand; L 1–3	2nd place, silver medalist(s)

== Vovinam ==
=== Performance ===
Athlete	Event	Score	Rank
Nguyễn Tứ Cường	Men's Five-Gate Form		

=== Fight ===
Athlete	Event	Quarterfinals	Semi-finals	Finals	
Athlete	Event	Opoosition Score	Opoosition Score	Opoosition Score	Rank
Nguyễn Viết Hà	Men's 65kg	Viengsavanh (LAO)			
Lê Thị Hiền	Women's 55kg	—N/a			

== Weightlifting ==
=== Men's ===
Athlete	Event	Snatch		Clean & Jerk		Total	Rank
Athlete	Event	Result	Rank	Result	Rank	Total	Rank
Lại Gia Thành	−55 kg	121	1	140	1	261	1st place, gold medalist(s)
Nguyễn Trần Anh Tuấn	−61 kg	DNF					
Trần Minh Trí	−67 kg	130	4	176; GR	1	306	1st place, gold medalist(s)
Bùi Kỹ Sư	−73 kg	136	3	175	2	311	3rd place, bronze medalist(s)
Nguyễn Quốc Toàn	−89 kg	155; GR	1	190; GR	1	345; GR	1st place, gold medalist(s)
Trần Đình Thắng	+89 kg	150	2	209; GR	1	359; GR	1st place, gold medalist(s)

=== Women's ===
Athlete	Event	Snatch		Clean & Jerk		Total	Rank
Athlete	Event	Result	Rank	Result	Rank	Total	Rank
Trần Thị Mỹ Dung	−49 kg	DNF					
Nguyễn Thị Thúy Tiền	−55 kg	85	2	DNF			
Hoàng Thị Duyên	−59 kg	93	2	112	4	205	3rd place, bronze medalist(s)
Đinh Thị Thu Uyên	−64 kg	96	2	98	3	194	2nd place, silver medalist(s)
Lâm Thị Mỹ Lệ	−71 kg	90	4	115	2	205	4
Pha Si Ro	+71 kg	106	3	140	3	246	3rd place, bronze medalist(s)
