= Weightlifting at the 2021 SEA Games =

- Venue: Hanoi Sports Training and Competition Centre
- Location: Hanoi, Vietnam
- Dates: 19–22 May 2022

The weightlifting competitions at the 2021 SEA Games took place at Hanoi Sports Training and Competition Centre in Hanoi, Vietnam from 13 to 15 May 2022.

== Participating nations ==
- Cambodia
- Indonesia
- Laos
- Malaysia
- Myanmar
- Philippines
- Thailand
- Timor-Leste
- Vietnam (host)

== Medal table ==
* Host nation (Vietnam)

Rank	Nation	Gold	Silver	Bronze	Total
1	Thailand	6	5	1	12
2	Vietnam*	3	4	4	11
3	Indonesia	3	3	4	10
4	Philippines	2	1	1	4
5	Malaysia	0	1	3	4
6	Myanmar	0	0	1	1
Totals (6 entries)		14	14	14	42

== Medalists ==
=== Men ===
Key
GR	SEA Games record	NR	National record

Event	Gold		Silver		Bronze	
55 kg	Lại Gia Thành; Vietnam	268 GR	Thada Somboon-uan; Thailand	256	Mohamad Aniq Kasdan; Malaysia	252 NR
61 kg	Eko Yuli Irawan; Indonesia	290	Muhammad Aznil Bidin; Malaysia	287 NR	Nguyễn Ngọc Trường; Vietnam	286
67 kg	Witsanu Chantri; Thailand	312	Mohammad Yasin; Indonesia	308	Đinh Xuân Hoàng; Vietnam	306
73 kg	Rahmat Erwin Abdullah; Indonesia	345 GR	Anucha Doungsri; Thailand	321	Muhammad Erry Hidayat; Malaysia	316 NR
81 kg	Suepsuan Natthawut; Thailand	355	Rizki Juniansyah; Indonesia	354	Nguyễn Quốc Toàn; Vietnam	340
89 kg	Muhammad Zul Ilmi; Indonesia	337	Bùi Tuấn Anh; Vietnam	334	Phachametrithi Tharaphan; Thailand	325
+89 kg	Rungsuriya Panya; Thailand	349	Nguyễn Minh Quang; Vietnam	348	Muhammad Hafiz Shamsuddin; Malaysia	342

=== Women ===
Event	Gold		Silver		Bronze	
45 kg	Thanyathon Sukcharoen; Thailand	174	Khổng Mỹ Phượng; Vietnam	172	Siti Nafisatul Hariroh; Indonesia	162
49 kg	Surodchana Khambao; Thailand	195	Phạm Đình Thi; Vietnam	183	Rosegie Ramos; Philippines	179
55 kg	Hidilyn Diaz; Philippines	206	Sanikun Tanasan; Thailand	203	Natasya Beteyob; Indonesia	188
59 kg	Hoàng Thị Duyên; Vietnam	204	Pimsiri Sirikaew; Thailand	196	Ta Boer Yar Naw; Myanmar	191
64 kg	Phạm Thị Hồng Thanh; Vietnam	230 GR	Elreen Ando; Philippines	223	Tsabitha Alfiah Ramadani; Indonesia	216
71 kg	Vanessa Sarno; Philippines	239 GR NR	Siriyakorn Khaipandung; Thailand	223	Restu Anggi; Indonesia	212
+71 kg	Duangaksorn Chaidee; Thailand	279	Nurul Akmal; Indonesia	252	Nguyễn Thị Kim Vân; Vietnam	251
