= Weightlifting at the 2023 SEA Games =

- Venue: Chroy Changvar Convention Centre
- Location: Phnom Penh, Cambodia
- Dates: 13–16 May 2023

The weightlifting competitions at the 2023 SEA Games took place at Chroy Changvar Convention Centre in Phnom Penh, Cambodia from 13 to 16 May 2023. The game featured 14 events, 7 men and 7 women events.

== Participating nations ==
- Cambodia (host)
- Indonesia
- Laos
- Malaysia
- Myanmar
- Philippines
- Thailand
- Timor-Leste
- Vietnam

== Medal table ==
* Host nation (Cambodia)

Rank	Nation	Gold	Silver	Bronze	Total
1	Indonesia	5	2	4	11
2	Vietnam	4	1	3	8
3	Thailand	2	7	1	10
4	Philippines	2	4	1	7
5	Myanmar	1	0	2	3
6	Cambodia*	0	0	1	1
6	Laos	0	0	1	1
6	Malaysia	0	0	1	1
Totals (8 entries)		14	14	14	42

== Medalists ==
=== Men ===
Key
GR	SEA Games record	NR	National record

Event	Gold		Silver		Bronze	
55 kg	Lại Gia Thành; Vietnam	261	Thada Somboon-uan; Thailand	248	Muhammad Husni; Indonesia	233
61 kg	Eko Yuli Irawan; Indonesia	303	John Ceniza; Philippines	297 NR	Teerapat Chomchuen; Thailand	296
67 kg	Trần Minh Trí; Vietnam	306	Witsanu Chantri; Thailand	305	Mohammad Yasin; Indonesia	304
73 kg	Rizki Juniansyah; Indonesia	347 GR	Anucha Doungsri; Thailand	315	Bùi Kỹ Sư; Vietnam	311
81 kg	Rahmat Erwin Abdullah; Indonesia	359 GR	Chatuphum Chinnawong; Thailand	325	Thi Ha Aung; Myanmar	290
89 kg	Nguyễn Quốc Toàn; Vietnam	345 GR	Muhammad Zul Ilmi; Indonesia	328	John Tabique; Philippines	310
+89 kg	Trần Đình Thắng; Vietnam	359 GR	Rungsuriya Panya; Thailand	358	Yan Myo Kyaw; Myanmar	300

=== Women ===
Event	Gold		Silver		Bronze	
45 kg	Zin May Oo; Myanmar	164	Angeline Colonia; Philippines	148	Bouakham Phongsakone; Laos	122
49 kg	Sanikun Tanasan; Thailand	191	Lovely Vidal Inan; Philippines	178	Luluk Diana Tri Wijayana; Indonesia	173
55 kg	Juliana Klarisa; Indonesia	186	Rosalinda Faustino; Philippines	184	Try Sopheakreach; Cambodia	83
59 kg	Elreen Ando; Philippines	216 GR	Suratwadee Yodsarn; Thailand	206	Hoàng Thị Duyên; Vietnam	205
64 kg	Tsabitha Alfiah Ramadani; Indonesia	204	Đinh Thị Thu Uyên; Vietnam	194	Nur Syazwani Radzi; Malaysia	184
71 kg	Vanessa Sarno; Philippines	225	Thipwara Chontavin; Thailand	208	Restu Anggi; Indonesia	206
+71 kg	Duangaksorn Chaidee; Thailand	270	Nurul Akmal; Indonesia	263	Pha Si Rô; Vietnam	246
