= Weightlifting at the 2021 SEA Games – Results =

The Weightlifting competitions at the 2021 SEA Games took place at Hanoi Sports Training and Competition Centre in Hanoi, Vietnam. It took place from 13 to 15 May 2022. The 2021 Games featured 14 events.

== Results ==
Key
GR	SEA Games record

=== Men's 55 kg ===
Rank	Athlete	Nation	Snatch (kg)				Clean & Jerk (kg)				Total
Rank	Athlete	Nation	1	2	3	Result	1	2	3	Result	Total
1st place, gold medalist(s)	Lại Gia Thành	Vietnam	116	120	~~123~~	120	141	145	148	148 GR	268 GR
2nd place, silver medalist(s)	Thada Somboon-uan	Thailand	110	~~115~~	115	115	135	139	141	141	256
3rd place, bronze medalist(s)	Mohamad Aniq Kasdan	Malaysia	105	110	~~114~~	110	139	142	~~147~~	142	252
4	Satrio Adi Nugroho	Indonesia	105	110	~~113~~	110	135	140	~~143~~	140	250
5	Fernando Agad	Philippines	105	110	113	113	135	~~138~~	~~138~~	135	248
6	Seyha Pich	Cambodia	70	~~75~~	76	76	90	95	~~98~~	95	171

=== Men's 61 kg ===
Rank	Athlete	Nation	Snatch (kg)				Clean & Jerk (kg)				Total
Rank	Athlete	Nation	1	2	3	Result	1	2	3	Result	Total
1st place, gold medalist(s)	Eko Yuli Irawan	Indonesia	130	135	~~138~~	135	~~155~~	155	—	155	290
2nd place, silver medalist(s)	Muhamad Aznil Bidin	Malaysia	123	127	~~131~~	127	153	~~160~~	160	160	287
3rd place, bronze medalist(s)	Nguyen Ngoc Truong	Vietnam	126	130	132	132	151	~~154~~	154	154	286
4	Rowel Garcia	Philippines	115	120	123	123	150	~~158~~	~~158~~	150	273
5	Pasit Saeng-ma	Thailand	105	~~110~~	110	110	~~135~~	135	~~140~~	135	245
6	Nousit Rattakon	Laos	85	~~90~~	~~90~~	85	95	~~97~~	97	97	182

=== Men's 67 kg ===
Rank	Athlete	Nation	Snatch (kg)				Clean & Jerk (kg)				Total
Rank	Athlete	Nation	1	2	3	Result	1	2	3	Result	Total
1st place, gold medalist(s)	Witsanu Chantri	Thailand	136	~~140~~	140	140	167	~~171~~	172	172	312
2nd place, silver medalist(s)	Mohammad Yasin	Indonesia	125	135	141	141	150	167	~~172~~	167	308
3rd place, bronze medalist(s)	Dinh Xuan Hoang	Vietnam	135	140	~~142~~	140	166	~~170~~	~~172~~	166	306
4	Nestor Colonia	Philippines	115	120	125	125	150	~~165~~		150	275
5	Ny Chanthanun	Cambodia	65	70	75	75	75	80	~~85~~	80	155

=== Men's 73 kg ===
Rank	Athlete	Nation	Snatch (kg)				Clean & Jerk (kg)				Total
Rank	Athlete	Nation	1	2	3	Result	1	2	3	Result	Total
1st place, gold medalist(s)	Rahmat Erwin Abdullah	Indonesia	142	150	155	155 GR	180	190	~~200~~	190 GR	345 GR
2nd place, silver medalist(s)	Anucha Doungsri	Thailand	135	140	~~143~~	140	172	177	181	181	321
3rd place, bronze medalist(s)	Muhammad Erry Hidayat	Malaysia	133	140	143	143	165	173	~~178~~	173	316
4	Lemon Denmark Tarro	Philippines	~~125~~	125	130	130	157	~~164~~	165	165	295
5	Bunroth Duch	Cambodia	83	86	90	90	100	~~106~~	~~110~~	100	190
–	Nguyễn Quang Trường	Vietnam	~~135~~	135	~~140~~	135	~~166~~	~~174~~	–	–	–
–	Jose Fernanior Martins Garcia Valiente	Timor-Leste	85	~~90~~	~~90~~	85	~~105~~	~~107~~	~~107~~	–	–

=== Men's 81 kg ===
Rank	Athlete	Nation	Snatch (kg)				Clean & Jerk (kg)				Total
Rank	Athlete	Nation	1	2	3	Result	1	2	3	Result	Total
1st place, gold medalist(s)	Suepsuan Natthawut	Thailand	145	150	155	155	190	195	200	200 GR	355 GR
2nd place, silver medalist(s)	Rizki Juniansyah	Indonesia	152	157	~~160~~	157 GR	192	197	~~200~~	197	354
3rd place, bronze medalist(s)	Nguyen Quoc Toan	Vietnam	145	150	~~155~~	150	175	190	~~195~~	190	340
4	Mohammad Nasir Roslan	Malaysia	135	~~140~~	140	140	165	~~170~~	–	165	305
5	Ye Yint Naing	Myanmar	~~125~~	125	128	128	160	~~165~~	~~165~~	160	288

=== Men's 89 kg ===
Rank	Athlete	Nation	Snatch (kg)				Clean & Jerk (kg)				Total
Rank	Athlete	Nation	1	2	3	Result	1	2	3	Result	Total
1st place, gold medalist(s)	Muhammad Zul Ilmi	Indonesia	143	147	150	150 GR	~~183~~	183	187	187 GR	337 GR
2nd place, silver medalist(s)	Bui Tuan Anh	Vietnam	138	143	147	147	171	180	187	187	334
3rd place, bronze medalist(s)	Phacharamethi Tharapan	Thailand	135	140	~~143~~	140	185	~~198~~	~~198~~	185	325
3	Naing Tun Win	Myanmar	135	~~140~~	~~140~~	135	165	170	~~175~~	170	305
5	John Kevin Padullo	Philippines	~~125~~	125	~~132~~	125	160	~~165~~	~~165~~	160	285

=== Men's +89 kg ===
Rank	Athlete	Nation	Snatch (kg)				Clean & Jerk (kg)				Total
Rank	Athlete	Nation	1	2	3	Result	1	2	3	Result	Total
1st place, gold medalist(s)	Rungsuriya Panya	Thailand	150	~~155~~	~~155~~	150	190	195	199	199 GR	349 GR
2nd place, silver medalist(s)	Nguyễn Minh Quang	Vietnam	~~152~~	152	~~160~~	152	192	196	~~199~~	196	348
3rd place, bronze medalist(s)	Muhammad Hafiz Shamsuddin	Malaysia	152	~~160~~	~~160~~	152 GR	180	~~190~~	190	190	342
4	Yan Myo Kyaw	Myanmar	135	140	143	143	171	180	~~185~~	180	323
5	John Dexter Tabique	Philippines	135	140	143	143	170	179	~~181~~	179	322

=== Women's 45 kg ===
Rank	Athlete	Nation	Snatch (kg)				Clean & Jerk (kg)				Total
Rank	Athlete	Nation	1	2	3	Result	1	2	3	Result	Total
1st place, gold medalist(s)	Thanyathon Sukcharoen	Thailand	75	77	79	79	93	95	~~100~~	95	174 GR
2nd place, silver medalist(s)	Khổng Mỹ Phượng	Vietnam	76	78	80	80 GR	88	92	~~95~~	92	172
3rd place, bronze medalist(s)	Siti Nafisatul Hariroh	Indonesia	68	70	72	72	88	90	~~92~~	90	162
4	Mary Flor Diaz	Philippines	67	69	71	71	87	~~90~~	~~92~~	87	158

=== Women's 49 kg ===
Rank	Athlete	Nation	Snatch (kg)				Clean & Jerk (kg)				Total
Rank	Athlete	Nation	1	2	3	Result	1	2	3	Result	Total
1st place, gold medalist(s)	Surodchana Khambao	Thailand	83	86	88	88 GR	107	~~110~~	107 GR	107	195 GR
2nd place, silver medalist(s)	Dihn Thi Pham	Vietnam	~~78~~	78	80	80	97	100	103	103	183
3rd place, bronze medalist(s)	Rosegie Ramos	Philippines	75	79	81	81	95	98	~~100~~	98	179
4	Pyae Pyae Phyo	Myanmar	76	~~79~~	~~79~~	76	~~95~~	95	~~104~~	95	171
5	Borin Seng	Cambodia	~~45~~	~~46~~	50	50	55	~~57~~	58	58	108
—	Windy Cantika Aisah	Indonesia	82	86	~~88~~	86	~~100~~	~~100~~	~~100~~	—	—
—	Boukham Phongsakone	Laos	~~58~~	~~58~~	~~60~~	—	—	—	—	—	—

=== Women's 55 kg ===
Rank	Athlete	Nation	Snatch (kg)				Clean & Jerk (kg)				Total
Rank	Athlete	Nation	1	2	3	Result	1	2	3	Result	Total
1st place, gold medalist(s)	Hidilyn Diaz	Philippines	90	92	~~94~~	92	114	~~118~~	~~121~~	114	206
2nd place, silver medalist(s)	Sanikun Tanasan	Thailand	85	90	93	93 GR	104	110	~~114~~	110	203
3rd place, bronze medalist(s)	Natasya Beteyob	Indonesia	84	~~88~~	~~88~~	84	104	~~106~~	~~110~~	104	188
4	Nguyen Thu Hien	Vietnam	~~83~~	~~83~~	83	83	103	~~106~~	~~106~~	103	186
5	Elly Cascandra Engelbert	Malaysia	73	~~80~~	~~80~~	73	91	~~96~~	~~96~~	91	164
6	Tan Poch	Cambodia	46	49	~~55~~	49	60	~~65~~	~~65~~	60	109

=== Women's 59 kg ===
Rank	Athlete	Nation	Snatch (kg)				Clean & Jerk (kg)				Total
Rank	Athlete	Nation	1	2	3	Result	1	2	3	Result	Total
1st place, gold medalist(s)	Hoàng Thị Duyên	Vietnam	90	93	96	96 GR	108	~~113~~	~~116~~	108	204
2nd place, silver medalist(s)	Pimsiri Sirikaew	Thailand	83	86	~~88~~	86	105	108	110	110	196
3rd place, bronze medalist(s)	Ta Boer Yar Naw	Myanmar	80	83	85	85	100	~~105~~	106	106	191
4	Margaret Colonia	Philippines	~~80~~	80	83	83	105	~~109~~	~~109~~	105	188
5	Marceeta Marlyne Marcus	Malaysia	73	~~78~~	~~78~~	73	98	105	~~108~~	105	178
–	Sarah Sarah	Indonesia	~~85~~	~~85~~	~~85~~	–	–	–	–	–	–

=== Women's 64 kg ===
Rank	Athlete	Nation	Snatch (kg)				Clean & Jerk (kg)				Total
Rank	Athlete	Nation	1	2	3	Result	1	2	3	Result	Total
1st place, gold medalist(s)	Pham Thi Hong Thanh	Vietnam	98	101	104	104 GR	120	126	~~130~~	126 GR	230 GR
2nd place, silver medalist(s)	Elreen Ando	Philippines	95	100	103	103	120	~~125~~	~~125~~	120	223
3rd place, bronze medalist(s)	Tsabitha Alfiah Ramadani	Indonesia	~~95~~	95	100	100	111	116	~~120~~	116	216
4	Rodsukon Sonkaew	Thailand	90	93	~~95~~	93	~~117~~	117	~~120~~	117	210
5	Sreynith Roan	Cambodia	~~53~~	54	~~58~~	54	65	67	~~70~~	67	121

=== Women's 71 kg ===
Rank	Athlete	Nation	Snatch (kg)				Clean & Jerk (kg)				Total
Rank	Athlete	Nation	1	2	3	Result	1	2	3	Result	Total
1st place, gold medalist(s)	Vanessa Sarno	Philippines	97	101	104	104 GR	123	130	135	135 GR	239 GR
2nd place, silver medalist(s)	Siriyakorn Khaipandung	Thailand	97	101	103	103	115	118	120	120	223
3rd place, bronze medalist(s)	Restu Anggi	Indonesia	88	90	92	92	115	120	~~124~~	120	212
4	Lam Thi My Le	Vietnam	88	91	93	93	108	~~115~~	~~115~~	108	201

=== Women's +71 kg ===
Rank	Athlete	Nation	Snatch (kg)				Clean & Jerk (kg)				Total
Rank	Athlete	Nation	1	2	3	Result	1	2	3	Result	Total
1st place, gold medalist(s)	Duangaksorn Chaidee	Thailand	115	120	123	123 GR	145	152	156	156 GR	279 GR
2nd place, silver medalist(s)	Nurul Akmal	Indonesia	105	110	~~115~~	110	140	142	~~151~~	142	252
3rd place, bronze medalist(s)	Nguyen Van Thi Kim	Vietnam	100	105	111	111	130	~~140~~	140	140	251
4	Kristel Macrohon	Philippines	95	~~100~~	~~100~~	95	125	130	133	133	228
5	Sonia Cassandra Anak Masnev	Malaysia	85	90	~~96~~	90	115	123	~~131~~	123	213
