= Weightlifting at the 2013 SEA Games – Women's 63 kg =

The Women's 63 kg event at the 2013 SEA Games took place on 15 December 2013 at Thein Phyu Stadium.

== Schedule ==
All times are Myanmar Standard Time (UTC+06:30)

Date	Time	Event
Sunday, 15 December 2013	16:00	Final

== Results ==
Rank	Athlete	Group	Body weight	Snatch (kg)				Clean & Jerk (kg)				Total
Rank	Athlete	Group	Body weight	1	2	3	Result	1	2	3	Result	Total
1st place, gold medalist(s)	Pimsiri Sirikaew (THA)	A	61.00	~~95~~	95	99	99	120	126	132	132	231
2nd place, silver medalist(s)	Sinta Darmariani (INA)	A	62.85	89	93	~~95~~	93	~~113~~	113	116	116	209
3rd place, bronze medalist(s)	Mai Nguyen Thi Tuyet (VIE)	A	62.10	~~88~~	88	~~91~~	88	113	~~121~~	~~121~~	113	201
4	Thaw Yay Phaw (MYA)	A	60.80	90	~~93~~	~~93~~	90	~~110~~	110	~~113~~	110	200
5	Elyone Martin (MAS)	A	61.35	75	~~79~~	~~81~~	75	~~94~~	94	~~96~~	94	169

== New records ==
The following records were established during the competition.

Clean & Jerk	132	Pimsiri Sirikaew (THA)	GR
Total	231	Pimsiri Sirikaew (THA)	GR
