= 2025 World Weightlifting Championships – Men's 79 kg =

Men's 79 kg at the 2025 World Weightlifting Championships
- Venue: Førdehuset
- Location: Førde, Norway
- Dates: 6 October
- Winning total: 361 kg

Medalists
gold medal	Rizki Juniansyah	Indonesia
silver medal	Ri Chong-song	North Korea
bronze medal	Mohamed Younes	Egypt

The men's 79 kilograms competition at the 2025 World Weightlifting Championships was held on 6 October 2025.

== Schedule ==
Date	Time	Event
6 October 2025	10:00	Group D
6 October 2025	12:00	Group C
6 October 2025	17:00	Group B
6 October 2025	19:30	Group A

== Records ==
Prior to this competition, the existing world records were as follows.

World record	Snatch	World Standard	165 kg	—	1 June 2025
World record	Clean & Jerk	World Standard	202 kg	—	1 June 2025
World record	Total	World Standard	361 kg	—	1 June 2025

== Results ==
Rank	Athlete	Group	Snatch (kg)				Clean & Jerk (kg)				Total
Rank	Athlete	Group	1	2	3	Rank	1	2	3	Rank	Total
1st place, gold medalist(s)	Rizki Juniansyah (INA)	A	157	~~162~~	~~162~~	3rd place, bronze medalist(s)	195	204 CWR	—	1st place, gold medalist(s)	361
2nd place, silver medalist(s)	Ri Chong-song (PRK)	A	160	163	~~166~~	1st place, gold medalist(s)	~~197~~	197	~~201~~	6	360
3rd place, bronze medalist(s)	Mohamed Younes (EGY)	A	162	~~167~~	~~167~~	2nd place, silver medalist(s)	~~198~~	198	~~201~~	5	360
4	Rahmat Erwin Abdullah (INA)	B	150	156	—	5	192	203	—	2nd place, silver medalist(s)	359
5	Caden Cahoy (USA)	A	150	154	155	8	193	198	~~204~~	4	353
6	Yedige Yemberdi (KAZ)	A	145	151	155	7	190	196	~~199~~	7	351
7	Ning Gan (CHN)	A	153	157	~~161~~	4	186	~~195~~	~~196~~	10	343
8	Ryan Grimsland (USA)	B	147	152	~~155~~	9	185	190	~~195~~	8	342
9	Abdollah Beiranvand (IRI)	B	149	153	156	6	176	181	184	11	340
10	Rakuei Azuma (JPN)	B	143	148	~~151~~	14	183	188	~~195~~	9	336
11	Ritvars Suharevs (LAT)	A	146	150	~~153~~	13	184	~~188~~	~~190~~	12	334
12	Vadzim Likharad (AIN)	B	148	151	~~155~~	10	175	180	~~184~~	16	331
13	Petr Khrebtov (KAZ)	B	142	147	~~150~~	16	~~183~~	183	~~188~~	13	330
14	Briken Calja (ALB)	C	147	~~151~~	~~151~~	15	175	181	~~183~~	14	328
15	Huang Pin-hsun (TPE)	C	140	145	~~150~~	19	176	181	~~186~~	15	326
16	Ajaya Babu Valluri (IND)	C	146	~~150~~	~~150~~	17	172	177	~~180~~	17	323
17	Elkhan Aligulizada (AZE)	C	140	145	~~151~~	18	170	~~178~~	~~180~~	18	315
18	Samuel Guertin (CAN)	C	~~136~~	136	139	21	166	~~171~~	~~172~~	19	305
19	Petr Mareček (CZE)	C	135	~~141~~	~~141~~	22	~~165~~	~~166~~	166	20	301
20	James Whiteman (CAN)	C	128	133	~~137~~	23	~~166~~	~~166~~	166	21	299
21	Timo Heikuksela (FIN)	C	~~133~~	~~133~~	133	24	160	~~166~~	~~166~~	22	293
22	Nikola Todorović (CRO)	D	120	~~124~~	124	25	148	153	~~158~~	24	277
23	Remy Aune (NOR)	C	117	~~121~~	121	27	~~156~~	~~156~~	156	23	277
24	Issa Al-Balushi (UAE)	D	115	120	122	26	145	150	~~152~~	25	272
25	Gustav Wang Hansen (DEN)	D	112	~~116~~	~~117~~	29	~~145~~	145	~~152~~	26	257
26	Sood Al-Mutairi (KUW)	D	80	—	—	31	100	—	—	27	180
27	Sultan Al-Qahtani (KUW)	D	65	70	75	32	85	—	—	28	160
—	Natthawut Suepsuan (THA)	A	150	~~156~~	~~156~~	12	~~187~~	~~187~~	~~187~~	—	—
—	Son Hyeon-ho (KOR)	A	~~155~~	~~155~~	~~155~~	—	198	~~202~~	~~205~~	3rd place, bronze medalist(s)	—
—	Oscar Reyes (ITA)	A	~~157~~	~~157~~	~~157~~	—	—	—	—	—	—
—	Erkand Qerimaj (ALB)	B	~~149~~	~~150~~	150	11	~~180~~	~~182~~	~~182~~	—	—
—	Erry Hidayat Muhammad (MAS)	C	140	~~143~~	—	20	~~170~~	~~170~~	~~170~~	—	—
—	Inocent Jakalase (BOT)	D	102	106	112	30	~~115~~	~~118~~	~~120~~	—	—
—	Anthony Masinde (KEN)	D	118	~~123~~	~~124~~	28	~~145~~	~~145~~	~~145~~	—	—
—	Chris Murray (GBR)	D	~~30~~	—	—	—	~~30~~	—	—	—	—
—	Roberto Gutu (GER)	B	Did not start								
X	Iain Wilson (CWF)	D	~~123~~	123	126	X	154	~~158~~	~~158~~	X	280
X	James Knox (CWF)	D	~~117~~	117	122	X	140	145	148	X	270
X	Jason Epton (CWF)	C	~~123~~	~~123~~	~~123~~	X	147	—	—	X	—
