= John Ceniza =

Filipino weightlifter (born 1998)

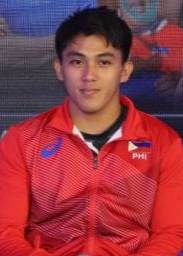
- Ceniza in 2024

Personal information
- Full name: John Febuar Ceniza
- Citizenship: Filipino
- Born: 7 February 1998 (age 28) Cebu City, Philippines
- Education: University of Cebu
- Height: 1.66 m (5 ft 5 in)

Sport
- Country: Philippines
- Sport: Weightlifting
- Weight class: 61 kg
- University team: University of Cebu Webmasters

Achievements and titles
- Personal bests: Snatch: 131 kg (2023, NR); Clean and jerk: 169 kg (2023, NR); Total: 297 kg (2023, NR)
Medal record
Men's weightlifting
Representing Philippines
IWF World Cup
Bronze medal – third place	2020 Rome	61 kg
Southeast Asian Games
Silver medal – second place	2019 Philippines	55 kg
Silver medal – second place	2023 Cambodia	61 kg

John Febuar Ceniza (born 7 February 1998) is a Filipino weightlifter. He represented the Philippines at the 2024 Summer Olympics in Paris, France.

== Career ==
Ceniza is a silver medalist in the men's 55kg category event of the 2019 Southeast Asian Games.

At the Roma 2020 Weightlifting World Cup, he won a bronze medal in the men's 61 kg category.

Ceniza gathered enough Olympic ranking points to qualify for the 2024 Summer Olympics in Paris. Ceniza failed to record any lift in the Snatch in the men's 61 kg category event. He made three attempts at 125 kg. He was still recovering from a shoulder injury at the time.

In October 2025, Ceniza was imposed a two-year ban by the International Weightlifting Federation for failure to report his whearabouts within a 12-month period as part of anti-doping regulations.

== Achievements ==
Year	Venue	Weight	Snatch (kg)				Clean & Jerk (kg)				Total	Rank
Year	Venue	Weight	1	2	3	Rank	1	2	3	Rank	Total	Rank
Summer Olympics
2024	Paris, France	61 kg	~~125~~	~~125~~	~~125~~	—N/a	—	—	—	—N/a	DNF	—
World Championships
2019	Pattaya, Thailand	55 kg	110	115	117	7	145	~~148~~	~~148~~	5	262	6
2021	Tashkent, Uzbekistan	61 kg	115	~~118~~	~~118~~	14	145	148	150	7	265	8
2022	Bogotá, Colombia	61 kg	119	122	125	11	155	~~160~~	~~161~~	10	280	10
2023	Riyadh, Saudi Arabia	61 kg	128	131	~~133~~	8	~~165~~	165	~~170~~	5	296	5
IWF World Cup
2019	Fuzhou, China	61 kg	110	115	~~118~~	4	140	145	150	4	265	4
2020	Rome, Italy	61 kg	110	115	117	4	144	149	152	4	269	3rd place, bronze medalist(s)
2024	Phuket, Thailand	61 kg	130	132	~~134~~	4	163	166	168	4	300	4
Asian Games
2023	Hangzhou, China	61 kg	128	131	134	—N/a	~~163~~	163	~~167~~	—N/a	297	4
Asian Championships
2019	Ningbo, China	55 kg	105	~~108~~	~~108~~	4	~~129~~	129	~~132~~	5	234	5
2021	Tashkent, Uzbekistan	61 kg	105	110	~~115~~	8	135	~~143~~	~~143~~	10	245	8
2023	Jinju, South Korea	61 kg	125	128	~~131~~	5	160	165	~~168~~	4	293	5
