= Rizki Juniansyah =

Indonesian weightlifter (born 2003)

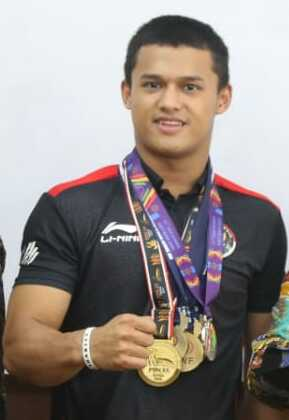
- Juniansyah in 2022

Personal information
- Nickname: Kijun
- Born: 17 June 2003 (age 23) Serang, Banten, Indonesia
- Education: Sports science at STKIP Banten

Sport
- Country: Indonesia
- Sport: Weightlifting
- Weight class: 73 kg; 81 kg
- Coached by: Muhammad Yasin; Triyatno
Medal record
Men's weightlifting
Representing Indonesia
Olympic Games
| Gold medal – first place | 2024 Paris | 73 kg |
World Championships
| Gold medal – first place | 2025 Førde | 79 kg |
| Silver medal – second place | 2022 Bogotá | 73 kg |
| Silver medal – second place | 2024 Manama | 73 kg |
IWF World Cup
| Gold medal – first place | 2024 Phuket | 73 kg |
Asian Championships
| Silver medal – second place | 2024 Tashkent | 73 kg |
| Silver medal – second place | 2025 Jiangshan | 81 kg |
Islamic Solidarity Games
| Gold medal – first place | 2021 Konya | 73 kg S |
| Gold medal – first place | 2021 Konya | 73 kg C&J |
| Gold medal – first place | 2021 Konya | 73 kg T (Note: At the 2021 Islamic Solidarity Games, medals from the snatch, clean & jerk and total are calculated separately and are all included in the medal table.) |
SEA Games
| Gold medal – first place | 2023 Cambodia | 73 kg |
| Gold medal – first place | 2025 Thailand | 79 kg |
| Silver medal – second place | 2021 Vietnam | 81 kg |
Southeast Asian Championships
| Gold medal – first place | 2025 Singapore | 88 kg |
Junior World Championships
| Gold medal – first place | 2021 Tashkent | 73 kg |
| Gold medal – first place | 2022 Heraklion | 73 kg |
Asian Junior Championships
| Gold medal – first place | 2022 Tashkent | 73 kg |
Youth World Cup
| Gold medal – first place | 2020 Lima | 73 kg |
Asian Youth Championships
| Gold medal – first place | 2020 Tashkent | 73 kg |
| Silver medal – second place | 2019 Pyongyang | 67 kg |

Rizki Juniansyah (born 17 June 2003) is an Indonesian weightlifter who currently specializes in the men's 79 kg lightweight class and holds various world records at the youth, junior, and senior IWF competition levels. He is the current Olympic champion, having won gold at the Paris 2024 Olympic Games, making him Indonesia's youngest Olympic gold medalist in history and its first in weightlifting.

== Early career ==
Juniansyah grew up in a family with a strong background in weightlifting and began training as early as nine years old. His father, M. Yasin (1966–2024), a successful national weightlifter, represented Indonesia in five consecutive SEA Games from 1983 to 1993 and clinched bronze medals at the 1985 and 1987 SEA Games. His mother and two older siblings were also competitive weightlifters. His brother-in-law, Triyatno, who later became his coach, is a bronze and silver medalist at the 2008 and 2012 Olympics, respectively.

He began his career at a young age, winning gold medals at the 2017 and 2018 PPLP National Championships. Additionally, he has earned gold medals at the 2018 Youth Regional Sports Week, the 2018 Provincial Sports Week, and the 2021 National Sports Week, representing Banten.

== Youth and Junior World Records ==
By the age of 17, Juniansyah had achieved a remarkable feat by holding five youth and junior world records. In 2020, he set two youth world records with a 139 kg snatch (current) and 307 kg total lift at the 2020 Asian Youth & Junior Weightlifting Championships. Later that year, the Youth World Weightlifting Championships were cancelled due to COVID-19 and replaced by an online event called the IWF Youth World Cup. Juniansyah won gold medal with impressive final figures of 145–180–325, surpassing all three youth world records at the time (including his own). Although these figures remain above the current records and were achieved in an IWF-organized event, they are not officially recognized. In acknowledgment of his performance, the IWF awarded him the title of 'The Best Lifter' in the competition.

Progressing through the junior levels, Juniansyah set three junior world records in the 73 kg category with final figures of 155-194-349 at the 2021 Junior World Weightlifting Championships. In 2022, he set two more consecutive junior world records. First, he broke his own previous record with a 156 kg snatch, securing first place at the 2022 Junior World Weightlifting Championships and successfully defending his 2021 title. Later that year, he further improved the record with a 157 kg snatch (the current record), earning him the top podium spot at the 2022 Asian Youth & Junior Weightlifting Championships.

== Road to Paris 2024 and Olympic Champion ==
In 2023, Juniansyah won the SEA Games gold medal, setting three current games records with final figures of 156-191-347 in the 73 kg event. Three months later, in August 2023, he underwent an appendectomy and was required to take a 6-month break from training and competitions, which impacted his efforts to qualify for Paris 2024 Olympics.

By the end of January 2024, he resumed training and prepared for the next upcoming competitions. He successfully secured qualification for Paris by winning the gold medal at the 2024 IWF World Cup, where he set the current world record with a total lift of 365 kg.

At the Paris 2024 Olympics, Juniansyah won the gold medal in the men's 73 kg event, setting a new Olympic record with a 199 kg clean and jerk lift on his second attempt in the final. It was his Olympic debut and Juniansyah became the youngest Indonesian Olympic gold medalist at the age of 21.

This victory marked the end of China's five-consecutive-gold dominance in the lightweight category. It was also Indonesia's first Olympic gold medal in weightlifting in 72 years, since they began competing at the Helsinki 1952 Olympics, ending a streak of 7 silver and 8 bronze medals in the sport.

== Achievements and records ==
WR = World Record, C = Current, O = Olympic, G = Games, J = Junior, Y = Youth, N = National, U = Unrecognized

*World records are not officially recognized in the online event. The Best Lifter title was awarded.

| Year | Venue | Weight | Snatch (kg) | | | | Clean & Jerk (kg) | | | | Total | Rank |
| Year | Venue | Weight | 1 | 2 | 3 | Rank | 1 | 2 | 3 | Rank | Total | Rank |
Olympic Games
| 2024 | Paris, France | 73 kg | ~~155~~ | 155 | ~~162~~ | —N/a | 191 | 199 COR | — | —N/a | 354 | 1st place, gold medalist(s) |
World Championships
| 2022 | Bogotá, Colombia | 73 kg | 150 | 155 | ~~158~~ | 1st place, gold medalist(s) | 187 | 192 | ~~198~~ | 2nd place, silver medalist(s) | 347 | 2nd place, silver medalist(s) |
| 2023 | Riyadh, Saudi Arabia | 73 kg | — | — | — | — | — | — | — | — | — | — |
| 2024 | Manama, Bahrain | 73 kg | ~~146~~ | 150 | ~~160~~ | 8 | 180 | 190 | ~~200~~ | 3rd place, bronze medalist(s) | 340 | 2nd place, silver medalist(s) |
| 2025 | Førde, Norway | 79 kg | 157 | ~~162~~ | ~~162~~ | 3rd place, bronze medalist(s) | 195 | 204 CWR | — | 1st place, gold medalist(s) | 361 | 1st place, gold medalist(s) |
IWF World Cup
| 2024 | Phuket, Thailand | 73 kg | 155 | ~~164~~ | 164 | 2nd place, silver medalist(s) | 192 | 201 | ~~203~~ | 1st place, gold medalist(s) | 365 CWR | 1st place, gold medalist(s) |
Asian Championships
| 2022 | Manama, Bahrain | 73 kg | 147 | 152 | ~~158~~ | 1st place, gold medalist(s) | ~~186~~ | ~~186~~ | ~~186~~ | — | — | — |
| 2024 | Tashkent, Uzbekistan | 73 kg | 146 | 152 | 158 | 2nd place, silver medalist(s) | 180 | 187 | 195 | 2nd place, silver medalist(s) | 353 | 2nd place, silver medalist(s) |
| 2025 | Jiangshan, China | 81 kg | 150 | 156 | 161 | 2nd place, silver medalist(s) | 190 | 197 | ~~202~~ | 3rd place, bronze medalist(s) | 358 | 2nd place, silver medalist(s) |
SEA Games
| 2021 | Hanoi, Vietnam | 81 kg | 152 | 157 GR | ~~160~~ | —N/a | 192 | 197 | ~~200~~ | —N/a | 354 | 2nd place, silver medalist(s) |
| 2023 | Phnom Penh, Cambodia | 73 kg | ~~143~~ | 143 | 156 CGR | —N/a | 176 | ~~191~~ | 191 CGR | —N/a | 347 CGR | 1st place, gold medalist(s) |
| 2025 | Chonburi, Thailand | 79 kg | 152 | 156 | 160 CGR | —N/a | 185 | 195 | 205 CWR | —N/a | 365 CWR | 1st place, gold medalist(s) |
Islamic Solidarity Games
| 2021 | Konya, Turkey | 73 kg | 150 | ~~160~~ | ~~160~~ | 1st place, gold medalist(s) | 181 | 190 | ~~195~~ | 1st place, gold medalist(s) | 340 | 1st place, gold medalist(s) |
Junior World Championships
| 2021 | Tashkent, Uzbekistan | 73 kg | 142 | 146 | 155 JWR | 1st place, gold medalist(s) | 180 | 189 | 194 JWR | 1st place, gold medalist(s) | 349 JWR | 1st place, gold medalist(s) |
| 2022 | Heraklion, Greece | 73 kg | 147 | 156 JWR | – | 1st place, gold medalist(s) | 185 | ~~195~~ | ~~199~~ | 1st place, gold medalist(s) | 341 | 1st place, gold medalist(s) |
Asian Junior Championships
| 2020 | Tashkent, Uzbekistan | 73 kg | 127 | 132 | 139 | 4 | 160 | 165 | 168 | 4 | 307 | 4 |
| 2022 | Tashkent, Uzbekistan | 73 kg | 149 | 154 | 157 CJWR | 1st place, gold medalist(s) | 182 | ~~195~~ | ~~195~~ | 1st place, gold medalist(s) | 339 | 1st place, gold medalist(s) |
Youth World Cup
| 2020 | Lima, Peru Online Event* | 73 kg | 140 | 145 UYWR | ~~150~~ | 1st place, gold medalist(s) | 172 | 180 UYWR | ~~185~~ | 1st place, gold medalist(s) | 325 UYWR | 1st place, gold medalist(s) |
Asian Youth Championships
| 2019 | Pyongyang, North Korea | 67 kg | 120 | 125 | 130 | 2nd place, silver medalist(s) | 145 | 153 | 157 | 2nd place, silver medalist(s) | 287 | 2nd place, silver medalist(s) |
| 2020 | Tashkent, Uzbekistan | 73 kg | 127 | 132 | 139 CYWR | 1st place, gold medalist(s) | 160 | 165 | 168 | 1st place, gold medalist(s) | 307 YWR | 1st place, gold medalist(s) |

== Awards and nominations ==
| Award | Year | Category | Result | Ref. |
|---|---|---|---|---|
| Forbes | 2025 | 30 Under 30 Asia (Entertainment and Sports) | Placed | |
| SIWO PWI Award | 2026 | Best male athlete | Won | |
| The Game Changer Award by Indonesian Olympic Committee | 2026 | Best of the best | Won | |
