= Sarocha =

Sarocha (Thai: สโรชา) is a Thai feminine given name. People with the name include:

- Freen Sarocha (born 1998), actress, singer, model and entrepreneur
- Sarocha Pornudomsak (born 1976), journalist
- Sarocha Kamonkhon (born 1997), cyclist
- Sarocha Akaros (born 1997), model
