= List of SEA Games records in weightlifting =

This is the list of SEA Games records in weightlifting. Records are maintained in each weight class for the snatch lift, clean and jerk lift, and the total for both lifts.

== Current records ==
=== Men ===
♦ denotes a performance that is also a current world record. Statistics are correct as of 16 May 2023.

Event	Record	Athlete	Nation	Games	Date	Ref
55 kg
Snatch	122 kg	Lại Gia Thành	Vietnam	2019 Philippines	1 December 2019	
Clean & Jerk	148 kg	Lại Gia Thành	Vietnam	2021 Vietnam	19 May 2022	
Total	268 kg	Lại Gia Thành	Vietnam	2021 Vietnam	19 May 2022	
61 kg
Snatch	140 kg	Eko Yuli Irawan	Indonesia	2019 Philippines	2 December 2019	
Clean & Jerk	170 kg	Eko Yuli Irawan	Indonesia	2023 Cambodia	13 May 2023	
Total	309 kg	Eko Yuli Irawan	Indonesia	2019 Philippines	2 December 2019	
67 kg
Snatch	143 kg	Deni	Indonesia	2019 Philippines	3 December 2019	
Clean & Jerk	176 kg	Trần Minh Trí	Vietnam	2023 Cambodia	14 May 2023	
Total	315 kg	Deni	Indonesia	2019 Philippines	3 December 2019	
73 kg
Snatch	156 kg	Rizki Juniansyah	Indonesia	2023 Cambodia	14 May 2023	
Clean & Jerk	191 kg	Rizki Juniansyah	Indonesia	2023 Cambodia	14 May 2023	
Total	347 kg	Rizki Juniansyah	Indonesia	2023 Cambodia	14 May 2023	
81 kg
Snatch	158 kg	Rahmat Erwin Abdullah	Indonesia	2023 Cambodia	15 May 2023	
Clean & Jerk	201 kg	Rahmat Erwin Abdullah	Indonesia	2023 Cambodia	15 May 2023	
Total	359 kg	Rahmat Erwin Abdullah	Indonesia	2023 Cambodia	15 May 2023	
89 kg
Snatch	155 kg	Nguyễn Quốc Toàn	Vietnam	2023 Cambodia	16 May 2023	
Clean & Jerk	190 kg	Nguyễn Quốc Toàn	Vietnam	2023 Cambodia	16 May 2023	
Total	345 kg	Nguyễn Quốc Toàn	Vietnam	2023 Cambodia	16 May 2023	
+89 kg
Snatch	155 kg	Rungsuriya Panya	Thailand	2023 Cambodia	16 May 2023	
Clean & Jerk	209 kg	Trần Đình Thắng	Vietnam	2023 Cambodia	16 May 2023	
Total	359 kg	Trần Đình Thắng	Vietnam	2023 Cambodia	16 May 2023	

=== Women ===
Event	Record	Athlete	Nation	Games	Date	Ref
45 kg
Snatch	80 kg	Khổng Mỹ Phượng	Vietnam	2021 Vietnam	19 May 2022	
Clean & Jerk	96 kg	Lisa Setiawati	Indonesia	2019 Philippines	1 December 2019	
Total	174 kg	Thanyathon Sukcharoen	Thailand	2021 Vietnam	19 May 2022	
49 kg
Snatch	88 kg	Surodchana Khambao	Thailand	2021 Vietnam	19 May 2022	
Clean & Jerk	107 kg	Surodchana Khambao	Thailand	2021 Vietnam	19 May 2022	
Total	195 kg	Surodchana Khambao	Thailand	2021 Vietnam	19 May 2022	
55 kg
Snatch	93 kg	Sanikun Tanasan	Thailand	2021 Vietnam	20 May 2022	
Clean & Jerk	120 kg	Hidilyn Diaz	Philippines	2019 Philippines	2 December 2019	
Total	211 kg	Hidilyn Diaz	Philippines	2019 Philippines	2 December 2019	
59 kg
Snatch	98 kg	Elreen Ando	Philippines	2023 Cambodia	14 May 2023	
Clean & Jerk	118 kg	Elreen Ando	Philippines	2023 Cambodia	14 May 2023	
Total	216 kg	Elreen Ando	Philippines	2023 Cambodia	14 May 2023	
64 kg
Snatch	104 kg	Phạm Thị Hồng Thanh	Vietnam	2021 Vietnam	21 May 2022	
Clean & Jerk	126 kg	Phạm Thị Hồng Thanh	Vietnam	2021 Vietnam	21 May 2022	
Total	230 kg	Phạm Thị Hồng Thanh	Vietnam	2021 Vietnam	21 May 2022	
71 kg
Snatch	105 kg	Vanessa Sarno	Philippines	2023 Cambodia	15 May 2023	
Clean & Jerk	135 kg	Vanessa Sarno	Philippines	2021 Vietnam	21 May 2022	
Total	239 kg	Vanessa Sarno	Philippines	2021 Vietnam	21 May 2022	
+71 kg
Snatch	123 kg	Duangaksorn Chaidee	Thailand	2021 Vietnam	22 May 2022	
Clean & Jerk	156 kg	Duangaksorn Chaidee	Thailand	2021 Vietnam	22 May 2022	
Total	279 kg	Duangaksorn Chaidee	Thailand	2021 Vietnam	22 May 2022	
