= Mohammad Yasin (weightlifter) =

Indonesian weightlifter (born 2000)

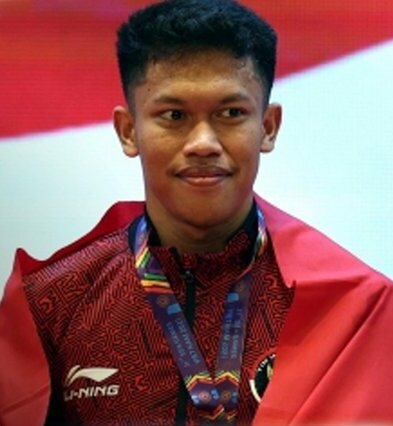

Personal information
- Nationality: Indonesian
- Born: 18 January 2000 (age 26)
- Weight: 66.35 kg (146 lb)

Sport
- Country: Indonesia
- Sport: Weightlifting
- Event: –67 kg
Medal record
Representing Indonesia
Asian Championships
Silver medal – second place	2022 Manama	67 kg
Islamic Solidarity Games
Silver medal – second place	2021 Konya	67 kg (snatch)
SEA Games
Silver medal – second place	2021 Vietnam	67 kg
Bronze medal – third place	2023 Cambodia	67 kg
Asian Junior Championships
Silver medal – second place	2020 Tashkent	67 kg
Bronze medal – third place	2019 Pyongyang	67 kg

Mohammad Yasin (born; 18 January 2000) is an Indonesian Weightlifter. He is a weightlifter competing in the 67 kg class since 2019 Asian Weightlifting Championships in Ningbo, China. He made his debut for the first time in an international competition at the 2017 Youth World Weightlifting Championships held in Bangkok, Thailand in the 62 kg class.

== International competition ==
At the 2017 Youth World Weightlifting Championships held in Bangkok, Thailand, he made his debut in international competitions in the men's -62 kg class. At that time he managed to lift the Snatch force 110 kg and Clean & Jerk 140 kg and his total lift was 150 kg and finished ninth under the lifter Turkmenistan, Bunýad Raşidow who was in eighth and above the lifter Uzbekistan, Asadbek Narimanov who came in tenth.

He participated for the second time in an international competition in the 2018 Junior World Weightlifting Championships which was held in Tashkent, Uzbekistan. At that time he was sixth with a total batch of 262 under the Egypt lifters, Ahmed Eltamadi and above the Turkey lifters, Ramazan Kara.

In 2019, he participated three times, first in the 2019 Asian Weightlifting Championships in Ningbo, China in the 67 kg class, after that in the 2019 Junior World Weightlifting Championships in Suva, Fiji and at the 2019 Asian Junior Weightlifting Championships which was held in Pyongyang, North Korea and in that competition, he won the first medal in an international competition, where he won a bronze medal.

In 2020, he participated in the 2020 Asian Junior Weightlifting Championships in Tashkent, Uzbekistan and won a silver medal.

He will participate at the 2020 Asian Weightlifting Championships who will take place from 16 to 25 April 2021, who was postponed from 16 to 25 April 2020, because the COVID-19 pandemic.
