= Rahmat Erwin Abdullah =

Indonesian weightlifter (born 2000)

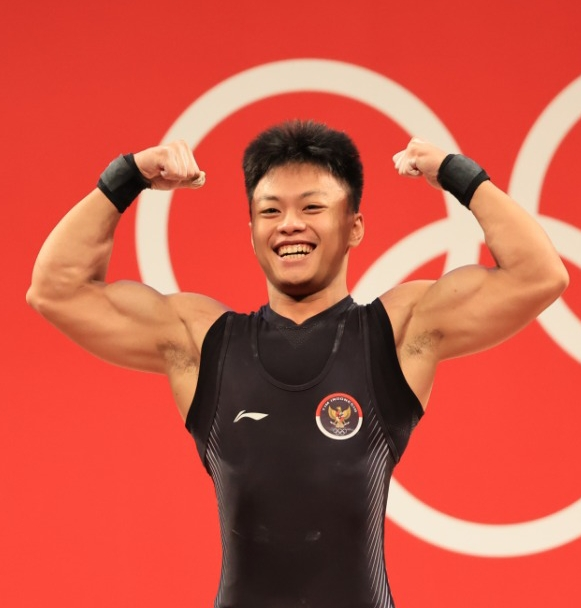
- Abdullah in 2021

Personal information
- Nationality: Indonesian
- Born: October 13, 2000 (age 26) Makassar, South Sulawesi, Indonesia
- Height: 173 cm (5 ft 8 in)
- Weight: 72 kg (159 lb)
- Spouse: Tsabitha Alfiah Ramadani (m. 2025)

Sport
- Country: Indonesia
- Sport: Weightlifting
- Event: 73 kg
Medal record
Men's weightlifting
Representing Indonesia
Olympic Games
Bronze medal – third place	2020 Tokyo	73 kg
World Championships
Gold medal – first place	2021 Tashkent	73 kg
Gold medal – first place	2022 Bogotá	73 kg
Silver medal – second place	2023 Riyadh	81 kg
Silver medal – second place	2026 Ningbo	75 kg
IWF World Cup
Bronze medal – third place	2024 Phuket	73 kg
IWF Grand Prix
Gold medal – first place	2023 Havana	81 kg
Silver medal – second place	2023 Doha	81 kg
Asian Games
Gold medal – first place	2022 Hangzhou	73 kg
Gold medal – first place	2026 Aichi–Nagoya	75 kg
Asian Championships
Gold medal – first place	2024 Tashkent	73 kg
Gold medal – first place	2025 Jiangshan	73 kg
Silver medal – second place	2022 Manama	81 kg
Islamic Solidarity Games
Silver medal – second place	2021 Konya	81 kg C&J (Note: At the 2021 Islamic Solidarity Games, medals from the snatch, clean & jerk and total are calculated separately and are all included in the medal table.)
Silver medal – second place	2021 Konya	81 kg T
SEA Games
Gold medal – first place	2019 Philippines	73 kg
Gold medal – first place	2021 Vietnam	73 kg
Gold medal – first place	2023 Cambodia	81 kg
Gold medal – first place	2025 Thailand	88 kg
Asian Junior Championships
Gold medal – first place	2019 Pyongyang	73 kg
Gold medal – first place	2020 Tashkent	73 kg

Rahmat Erwin Abdullah (born 13 October 2000) is an Indonesian weightlifter. He is a two-time gold medalist in the men's 73 kg event at the World Weightlifting Championships (2021 and 2022). He won a bronze medal at the 2020 Summer Olympics. He is a weightlifter competing in the 73 kg class since 2018 World Weightlifting Championships in Ashgabat, Turkmenistan. He made his international debut at the 2017 Youth World Weightlifting Championships held in Bangkok, Thailand in the 69 kg class.

== Biography ==
Abdullah is the only child of the former weightlifters Erwin Abdullah and Ami Asun Budiono. Erwin, who won silver medal at the 2002 Asian Games and originally qualified for the 2004 Summer Olympics, but was not allowed to compete due to injury. His mother Ami, won a gold medal at the 1995 SEA Games.

== Career ==
At the 2019 Asian Junior Championships held in Pyongyang, North Korea, he participated in the 73 kg category, winning his first gold medal. At that time, he managed to lift 147 kg in the snatch and 179 kg in the clean and jerk category, bringing the overall total to 326 kg and finishing first above the North Korean lifter, Ko Myong-ho.

After that competition, he participated in the 2019 SEA Games which was held in the Philippines. At that time he won the second gold medal in international competitions after defeating Vietnamese lifter, Phạm Tuấn Anh with a total lift of 322 kg while Vietnamese lifter with 304 kg.

Not only that, when he started the first international competition in 2020 at the 2020 Asian Junior Championships which was held in Tashkent, Uzbekistan, he won the third gold medal for his international competition after defeating Iranian lifter Mir Mostafa Javadi.

He represented Indonesia at the 2020 Summer Olympics in Tokyo, Japan. Despite he participated in Group B, he managed to won a bronze medal.

He won the gold medal in the men's 73 kg event at the 2022 World Weightlifting Championships held in Bogotá, Colombia.

He sets new world record in jerk two times with 202 kg and 204 kg.

== Awards and nominations ==
Award	Year	Category	Result	Ref.
Golden Award SIWO PWI	2021	Best Male Athlete	Nominated	
KONI Award	2021	Best Athlete	Won	

== Major results ==
Year	Venue	Weight	Snatch (kg)				Clean & Jerk (kg)				Total	Rank
Year	Venue	Weight	1	2	3	Rank	1	2	3	Rank	Total	Rank
Olympic Games
2021	Tokyo, Japan	73 kg	142	147	152	6	180	~~190~~	190	2	342	3rd place, bronze medalist(s)
World Championships
2018	Ashgabat, Turkmenistan	73 kg	135	~~140~~	141	19	162	168	171	21	312	19
2019	Pattaya, Thailand	73 kg	138	142	144	17	168	172	174	18	318	18
2021	Tashkent, Uzbekistan	73 kg	142	147	151	5	180	186	192	1st place, gold medalist(s)	343	1st place, gold medalist(s)
2022	Bogotá, Colombia	73 kg	152	~~157~~	~~157~~	4	192	~~200~~	200 WR	1st place, gold medalist(s)	352	1st place, gold medalist(s)
2023	Riyadh, Saudi Arabia	81 kg	145	—N/a	—N/a	14	190	200	209 CWR	1st place, gold medalist(s)	354	2nd place, silver medalist(s)
2024	Manama, Bahrain	81 kg	147	154	—N/a	9	193	~~200~~	~~202~~	6	347	7
2025	Førde, Norway	79 kg	150	156	—N/a	5	192	203	—N/a	2nd place, silver medalist(s)	359	4
2026	Ningbo, China	75 kg	153	157	__	5	195	202	~~207~~	2nd place, silver medalist(s)	359	2nd place, silver medalist(s)
IWF Grand Prix
2023	Havana, Cuba	81 kg	150	156	~~161~~	1st place, gold medalist(s)	190	202	~~209~~	1st place, gold medalist(s)	358	1st place, gold medalist(s)
2024	Doha, Qatar	81 kg	153	157	161	2nd place, silver medalist(s)	192	201	~~214~~	2nd place, silver medalist(s)	362	2nd place, silver medalist(s)
IWF World Cup
2024	Phuket, Thailand	73 kg	155	160	~~162~~	3rd place, bronze medalist(s)	195	~~206~~	~~206~~	2nd place, silver medalist(s)	355	3rd place, bronze medalist(s)
Asian Games
2018	Jakarta, Indonesia	77 kg	135	140	142	11	165	170	172	9	314	11
2023	Hangzhou, China	73 kg	152	156	158	2	192	196	201 WR	1	359	1st place, gold medalist(s)
2026	Aichi-Nagoya, Japan	75 kg	155	158	160	2	201	206 WR	_	1	366	1st place, gold medalist(s)
Asian Championships
2019	Ningbo, China	73 kg	137	141	~~147~~	6	~~165~~	165	171	10	312	9
2021	Tashkent, Uzbekistan	73 kg	142	148	~~150~~	5	182	187	~~190~~	3rd place, bronze medalist(s)	335	4
2022	Manama, Bahrain	81 kg	141	151	—N/a	3rd place, bronze medalist(s)	181	191	198	1st place, gold medalist(s)	349	2nd place, silver medalist(s)
2024	Tashkent, Uzbekistan	73 kg	~~153~~	157	159	1st place, gold medalist(s)	192	202 WR	204 WR	1st place, gold medalist(s)	363	1st place, gold medalist(s)
2025	Jiangshan, China	73 kg	150	155	—N/a	1st place, gold medalist(s)	195	200	205 CWR	1st place, gold medalist(s)	360	1st place, gold medalist(s)
Islamic Solidarity Games
2021	Konya, Turkey	81 kg	148	154	158	4	191	197	~~200~~	2nd place, silver medalist(s)	355	2nd place, silver medalist(s)
SEA Games
2019	Manila, Philippines	73 kg	138	142	145	1	168	172	177	1	322	1st place, gold medalist(s)
2022	Hanoi, Vietnam	73 kg	142	150	155 GR	1	180	190 GR	~~200~~	1	345 GR	1st place, gold medalist(s)
2023	Phnom Penh, Cambodia	81 kg	150	158 GR	—N/a	1	190	201 GR	—N/a	1	359 GR	1st place, gold medalist(s)
National Sports Week
2021	Jayapura, Indonesia	81 kg	140	145	150	1	180	190	~~200~~	1	340	1st place, gold medalist(s)
Junior World Championships
2018	Tashkent, Uzbekistan	77 kg	135	141	~~143~~	5	163	168	~~171~~	7	309	7
2019	Suva, Fiji	73 kg	130	137	—N/a	7	160	167	—N/a	10	304	7
Asian Junior Championships
2019	Pyongyang, North Korea	73 kg	141	145	147	1st place, gold medalist(s)	171	175	179	1st place, gold medalist(s)	326	1st place, gold medalist(s)
2020	Tashkent, Uzbekistan	73 kg	140	144	~~148~~	1st place, gold medalist(s)	170	180	185	1st place, gold medalist(s)	329	1st place, gold medalist(s)
Youth World Championships
2017	Bangkok, Thailand	69 kg	~~117~~	120	125	10	142	147	152	11	277	11
