= Weightlifting at the 2019 SEA Games – Results =

The Weightlifting competitions at the 2019 SEA Games in Manila took place at Ninoy Aquino Stadium in Manila.

The 2019 Games featured 10 events.

== Results ==
=== Men's 55 kg ===
Rank	Athlete	Nation	Snatch (kg)				Clean & Jerk (kg)				Total
Rank	Athlete	Nation	1	2	3	Result	1	2	3	Result	Total
1st place, gold medalist(s)	Lại Gia Thành	Vietnam	116	120	122	122	138	~~142~~	142	142	264
2nd place, silver medalist(s)	John Ceniza	Philippines	112	~~115~~	~~115~~	112	140	~~153~~	~~115~~	140	252
3rd place, bronze medalist(s)	Surahmat Wijoyo	Indonesia	110	~~114~~	~~114~~	110	140	~~144~~	~~144~~	140	250
4	Phyo Pyae	Myanmar	105	~~110~~	~~110~~	105	135	140	~~146~~	140	245
5	Aniq Kasdan	Malaysia	101	~~106~~	~~106~~	101	~~133~~	~~133~~	133	133	234
6	Tonesien Saechao	Laos	90	~~105~~	~~95~~	95	95	115	118	120	215

=== Men's 61 kg ===
Rank	Athlete	Nation	Snatch (kg)				Clean & Jerk (kg)				Total
Rank	Athlete	Nation	1	2	3	Result	1	2	3	Result	Total
1st place, gold medalist(s)	Eko Yuli Irawan	Indonesia	~~135~~	135	140	140	163	~~169~~	169	169	309
2nd place, silver medalist(s)	Thạch Kim Tuấn	Vietnam	~~135~~	135	~~140~~	135	160	~~169~~	169	169	304
3rd place, bronze medalist(s)	Muhamad Aznil bin Bidin	Malaysia	~~123~~	123	126	126	157	~~161~~	~~161~~	157	283
4	Dave Lloyd Pacaldo	Philippines	110	~~115~~	~~115~~	110	~~140~~	~~140~~	140	140	250
5	Khamsamouth Phethuenyao	Laos	75	78	~~80~~	78	103	~~105~~	~~105~~	105	181

=== Men's 67 kg ===
Rank	Athlete	Nation	Snatch (kg)				Clean & Jerk (kg)				Total
Rank	Athlete	Nation	1	2	3	Result	1	2	3	Result	Total
1st place, gold medalist(s)	Deni	Indonesia	135	140	143	143	165	172	~~175~~	172	315
2nd place, silver medalist(s)	Đinh Xuân Hoàng	Vietnam	130	~~135~~	135	135	160	173	~~181~~	173	308
3rd place, bronze medalist(s)	Nestor Colonia	Philippines	120	127	~~130~~	127	150	160	~~169~~	160	287
4	Naing Kaung Sett	Myanmar	~~115~~	115	~~120~~	115	140	150	~~153~~	150	265

=== Men's 73 kg ===
Rank	Athlete	Nation	Snatch (kg)				Clean & Jerk (kg)				Total
Rank	Athlete	Nation	1	2	3	Result	1	2	3	Result	Total
1st place, gold medalist(s)	Rahmat Erwin Abdullah	Indonesia	138	142	145	145	168	172	177	177	322
2nd place, silver medalist(s)	Phạm Tuấn Anh	Vietnam	132	136	~~139~~	136	163	168	~~178~~	168	304
3rd place, bronze medalist(s)	Mohd Erry Hidayat	Malaysia	~~130~~	132	~~137~~	132	160	165	168	168	300
4	Win Kyaw Moe	Myanmar	125	130	~~133~~	130	162	168	~~171~~	168	298

=== Women's 45 kg ===
Rank	Athlete	Nation	Snatch (kg)				Clean & Jerk (kg)				Total
Rank	Athlete	Nation	1	2	3	Result	1	2	3	Result	Total
1st place, gold medalist(s)	Vương Thị Huyền	Vietnam	73	75	77	77	91	93	95	95	172
2nd place, silver medalist(s)	Lisa Setiawati	Indonesia	~~71~~	71	73	73	93	96	~~100~~	96	169
3rd place, bronze medalist(s)	Mary Flor Diaz	Philippines	~~70~~	70	~~72~~	70	89	~~92~~	~~93~~	89	159
4	Nurul Afiqah Muhammad Zamzuri	Malaysia	57	59	~~77~~	59	~~77~~	77	~~79~~	77	136
—	Zin May Oo	Myanmar	71	~~73~~	73	73	~~90~~	~~92~~	~~93~~	—	DNF

=== Women's 49 kg ===
Rank	Athlete	Nation	Snatch (kg)				Clean & Jerk (kg)				Total
Rank	Athlete	Nation	1	2	3	Result	1	2	3	Result	Total
1st place, gold medalist(s)	Windy Cantika Aisah	Indonesia	80	84	86	86 YWR	~~100~~	100	104	104 YWR	190 YWR
2nd place, silver medalist(s)	Pyae Pyae Phyo	Myanmar	75	~~80~~	80	80	95	100	~~111~~	100	180
3rd place, bronze medalist(s)	Ngô Thị Quyên	Vietnam	75	~~78~~	~~78~~	75	95	~~97~~	97	97	172
4	Elien Rose Perez	Philippines	70	~~75~~	75	75	90	96	~~98~~	96	171
5	Bouakham Phongsakone	Laos	55	~~58~~	~~58~~	55	65	68	70	70	125

=== Women's 55 kg ===
Rank	Athlete	Nation	Snatch (kg)				Clean & Jerk (kg)				Total
Rank	Athlete	Nation	1	2	3	Result	1	2	3	Result	Total
1st place, gold medalist(s)	Hidilyn Diaz	Philippines	88	91	~~94~~	91	110	115	120	120	211
2nd place, silver medalist(s)	Nguyễn Thị Thúy	Vietnam	82	~~85~~	~~85~~	82	105	110	115	115	197
3rd place, bronze medalist(s)	Juliana Klarisa	Indonesia	73	76	80	80	95	~~101~~	~~104~~	95	175
4	Elly Cassandra Engelbert	Malaysia	72	~~75~~	~~76~~	72	88	92	~~95~~	92	164
5	Maiya Vue	Laos	60	~~62~~	63	63	75	~~78~~	~~80~~	75	138

=== Women's 59 kg ===
Rank	Athlete	Nation	Snatch (kg)				Clean & Jerk (kg)				Total
Rank	Athlete	Nation	1	2	3	Result	1	2	3	Result	Total
1st place, gold medalist(s)	Hoàng Thị Duyên	Vietnam	90	~~95~~	95	95	105	110	115	115	210
2nd place, silver medalist(s)	Margaret Colonia	Philippines	77	80	82	82	103	107	~~110~~	107	189
3rd place, bronze medalist(s)	Putri Aulia Andriani	Indonesia	79	~~82~~	~~83~~	79	98	~~107~~	~~107~~	98	177
4	Marceeta Marcus	Malaysia	70	~~75~~	~~75~~	70	97	101	~~103~~	101	171
5	Su Thin Thin	Myanmar	70	~~75~~	~~75~~	70	90	95	~~98~~	95	165

=== Women's 64 kg ===
Rank	Athlete	Nation	Snatch (kg)				Clean & Jerk (kg)				Total
Rank	Athlete	Nation	1	2	3	Result	1	2	3	Result	Total
1st place, gold medalist(s)	Phạm Thị Hồng Thanh	Vietnam	~~90~~	~~90~~	90	90	107	~~124~~	124	124	214
2nd place, silver medalist(s)	Elreen Ann Ando	Philippines	91	95	98	98	110	115	~~120~~	115	213
3rd place, bronze medalist(s)	Bernadicta Study	Indonesia	73	78	~~81~~	78	90	101	108	108	186
—	Halaing Wai Wai	Myanmar	~~70~~	~~70~~	~~70~~	—	—	—	—	—	DNF

=== Women's 71 kg ===
Rank	Athlete	Nation	Snatch (kg)				Clean & Jerk (kg)				Total
Rank	Athlete	Nation	1	2	3	Result	1	2	3	Result	Total
1st place, gold medalist(s)	Kristel Macrohon	Philippines	90	93	~~95~~	93	116	120	123	123	216
2nd place, silver medalist(s)	Nguyen Thi Van	Vietnam	~~92~~	~~92~~	92	92	118	122	~~125~~	122	214
3rd place, bronze medalist(s)	Tsabitha Ramadani	Indonesia	86	90	93	93	100	105	110	110	203
4	Jabriella Samuel	Malaysia	81	~~85~~	~~85~~	81	~~100~~	100	~~105~~	100	181
5	Aye Zin Mar	Myanmar	70	75	~~80~~	75	90	95	100	100	175
