= Vanessa Sarno =

Filipino weightlifter (born 2003)

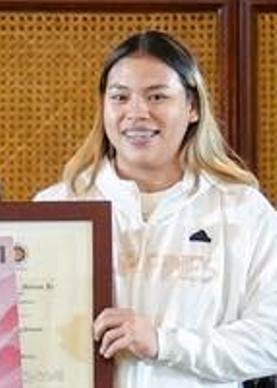
- Sarno in 2024

Personal information
- Nationality: Filipino
- Born: September 28, 2003 (age 22)
- Home town: Tagbilaran, Bohol
- Height: 1.63 m (5 ft 4 in)

Sport
- Country: Philippines
- Sport: Weightlifting
- Event: –71 kg
- Coached by: Richard Agosto

Achievements and titles
- Personal bests: Snatch: 108 kg (2023, NR); Clean & Jerk: 141 kg (2023, NR); Total: 249 kg (2023, NR)
Medal record
Event	1st	2nd	3rd
Asian Championships	1	1	0
Southeast Asian Games	2	0	0
Total	3	1	0
Representing the Philippines
Asian Championships
Gold medal – first place	2020 Tashkent	–71 kg
Silver medal – second place	2023 Jinju	–71 kg
Southeast Asian Games
Gold medal – first place	2021 Vietnam	–71 kg
Gold medal – first place	2023 Cambodia	–71 kg

Vanessa Palomar Sarno (born September 28, 2003) is a Filipino weightlifter who is a gold medalist in major international competitions, including the 2020 Asian Weightlifting Championships and the 2023 Southeast Asian Games. She has set new Philippine records and won three gold medals at the 2023 Asian Youth and Junior Championships.

In 2025, Sarno was given a two-year ban set to expire in August 2027 for an anti-doping rule violation.

== Early career and education ==
Sarno was born on September 28, 2003 and is the second of four children. Her parents work as fishers for their family's livelihood. Sarno took up weightlifting after she joined her cousins train in a gymnasium in their home province of Bohol. She then developed a hobby of lifting barbells. She was also influenced to take up the sport at 9 years old by her father, who also competed as a powerlifter in his youth. She also attended the Bohol Institute of Technology in Tagbilaran for her secondary education.

At a young age, she joined the Philippine Sports Commission-organized 2014 Batang Pinoy which was hosted in Bacolod, where she won a gold medal in the -32 kg category.

== Career ==
Sarno went on to represent the Philippines in international competitions, joining weightlifting competitions in Indonesia in 2015, and in Thailand in 2018. At the 2019 Asian Youth and Junior Championships in North Korea, she clinched two golds (overall and snatch) and one silver (clean and jerk) in the 71-kg division. She also joined the 2020 IWF Online World Youth Championship hosted by Peru where she won three gold medals (snatch, clean and jerk, and overall) in the 71-kg division.

At the 2020 Asian Weightlifting Championships in Tashkent, Uzbekistan, which was delayed by a year due to the COVID-19 pandemic, Sarno clinched the gold medal in the -71 kg category, and also won two small medals; a gold for the clean and jerk and a silver for the snatch. After the tournament, she has been touted by local sports officials as a "successor" of Olympian Hidilyn Diaz and is seen as one of the Filipino contenders to qualify for the 2024 Summer Olympics in Paris. Although the national weightlifting federation, the Samahang Weightlifting ng Pilipinas (SWP), began lobbying for Sarno's entry to the 2020 Summer Olympics in Tokyo as a wild card.

At the 2023 Asian Youth and Junior Weightlifting Championships in India, Sarno clinched three gold medals despite being ill a few days prior competing.

On April 7, 2024, posted a new Philippine record in the snatch category in the 71 kg event of IWF World Cup in Phuket by lifting 110 kg to break the previous record of 108 kg she herself set in 2023. She would place fifth courtesy of her total lift of 245 kg. After the event, Sarno garnered sufficient IWF Olympic Qualification Ranking to secure a berth in the 2024 Paris Olympics.

In preparation for her participation, she trained in Metz although she was assigned a different coach than her longtime mentor Richard Agosto. She would attribute a "toxic environment" she experienced in the camp including the coaching change to her failure to register a lift in the snatch in the 2024 Summer Olympics. Agosto himself would be with Sarno at the competition proper.

In August 2025, Sarno was issued with a two-year ban set to expire in August 2027 for an anti-doping rule violation for three whereabouts failures (missed tests and/or filing failures) in a twelve-month period. According to SWP President Monico Puentevella, Sarno opted not to report her whereabouts due to an ongoing pregnancy and that she has accepted the sanction.

== Major results ==
Year	Venue	Weight	Snatch (kg)				Clean & Jerk (kg)				Total	Rank
Year	Venue	Weight	1	2	3	Rank	1	2	3	Rank	Total	Rank
Summer Olympics
2024	Paris, France	71 kg	~~100~~	~~100~~	~~100~~	—N/a	—	—	—	—N/a	DNF	—
World Championships
2021	Tashkent, Uzbekistan	71 kg	95	101	103	5	128	~~131~~	~~131~~	4	231	5
2022	Bogotá, Colombia	71 kg	90	96	99	16	125	~~128~~	~~128~~	10	224	13
2023	Riyadh, Saudi Arabia	71 kg	~~100~~	100	~~104~~	20	—	—	—	—	—	—
IWF World Cup
2024	Phuket, Thailand	71 kg	105	108	110	5	~~135~~	135	~~138~~	6	245	5
Asian Games
2023	Hangzhou, China	76 kg	100	105	~~108~~	—N/a	130	~~136~~	~~136~~	—N/a	235	5
Asian Championships
2021	Tashkent, Uzbekistan	71 kg	93	97	101	2nd place, silver medalist(s)	120	124	128	1st place, gold medalist(s)	229	1st place, gold medalist(s)
2023	Jinju, South Korea	71 kg	100	105	107	2nd place, silver medalist(s)	126	132	~~136~~	2nd place, silver medalist(s)	239	2nd place, silver medalist(s)
2024	Tashkent, Uzbekistan	71 kg	~~100~~	100	~~104~~	6	125	128	~~132~~	5	228	5
