= Hoàng Thị Duyên =

Vietnamese weightlifter (born 1996)

Personal information
- Born: 26 April 1996 (age 30) Lào Cai, Vietnam

Sport
- Country: Vietnam
- Sport: Weightlifting
Medal record
Women's weightlifting
Representing Vietnam
Asian Championships
| Bronze medal – third place | 2020 Tashkent | 59 kg |
IWF World Cup
| Gold medal – first place | 2020 Rome | 59 kg |
Southeast Asian Games
| Gold medal – first place | 2021 Vietnam | 59 kg |
| Bronze medal – third place | 2023 Cambodia | 59 kg |

Hoàng Thị Duyên (born 26 April 1996) is a Vietnamese Olympic weightlifter.

She won the silver medal in the Snatch in the women's 59 kg event at the 2018 World Weightlifting Championships held in Ashgabat, Turkmenistan.

In 2020, she won the gold medal in the women's 59 kg event at the Roma 2020 Weightlifting World Cup in Rome, Italy. In 2021, she won the bronze medal in her event at the 2020 Asian Weightlifting Championships held in Tashkent, Uzbekistan. she also represented Vietnam at the 2020 Summer Olympics in Tokyo, Japan. She finished in 5th place in the women's 59 kg event. In 2022, she won the gold medal in the women’s 59kg event at the 2021 SEA Games.

Duyen's passion for weight lifting grew in 2008 but beacause of her family's financial struggle she was encouraged to pursue education and find a stable job. Duyen sneakily went to the training center, skipping school.
