= Sukma Games =

National biennial multi-sport event in Malaysia

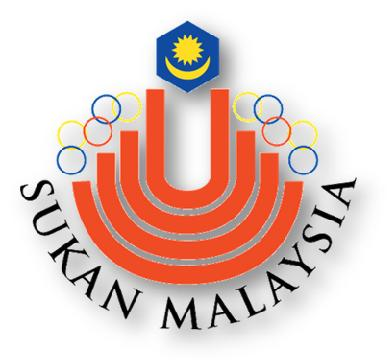
- Sukma Games logo
- Purpose: Multi-sport event for states in Malaysia
- Frequency: Every two years
- Inaugurated: 1986 Sukma Games in Kuala Lumpur
- Most recent: 2026 Sukma Games in Selangor
- Next event: 2028 Sukma Games in Kelantan
- Website: National Sports Council of Malaysia

The Sukma Games (Malay: Sukan Malaysia, lit. 'Malaysian Games') is a biennial national multi-sport event involving young athletes from Malaysia's 13 states and 3 Federal Territories. The games are regulated by the National Sports Council of Malaysia, the state sports council of the respective member states, the Olympic Council of Malaysia and the National Sports association of the games respective sporting event. The logo was designed by Anuar bin Dan in 1986. In late March 2010, it was reported that after 24 years of being a biennial event, the Sukma Games may be held annually, starting 2011. However, the frequency of the event did not change.

== History ==
=== Event proposal and conceptualisation (1983–1985) ===
The Sukma Games was first proposed by Anwar Ibrahim and conceived in 1986 by the National Sports Council of Malaysia under the leadership of sports minister Najib Razak as their commitment to the promotion and development of the Malaysian junior talent in sports.

Initial proposed events for the inaugural games included six sports like Athletics, Cycling, Table Tennis, Tennis, Sepak Takraw and Volleyball. The event number overtime increased to 21, when the event was announced in 1985, following inflow of ideas from members of the public, although this was eventually decreased following criticism about the objectives and budget (about 5 million ringgit at the time).

=== Implementation and debut (1986–1988) ===
The first Games held from 19 to 26 April 1986 featured 123 events in 16 sports, with participation of about 4,500 athletes from 16 teams representing Malaysia's 13 states, the Federal Territory of Kuala Lumpur, Police and Armed Forces. As the inaugural host, Kuala Lumpur emerged as overall champions with 36 golds. Most of the events were held within Kuala Lumpur City Proper, while some others were scattered across neighbouring towns in the Klang Valley like Subang Jaya and Serdang.

Kuala Lumpur was picked as the host again in 1988, with about 4,100 athletes participating. Although the number of sport and teams remained the same, there were 10 more events than the previous edition. In this edition, the team from neighbouring Selangor dethroned Kuala Lumpur and emerged as the new overall champion with 26 gold medals. The Games, regarded as a rehearsal for the 1989 SEA Games, was held from 12 until 19 November, although several events like Football and Sepak Takraw began as early as 9 and 10 November respectively.

== Participating teams ==
| Entity | Sports Council |
|---|---|
| Brunei ^{1} | Brunei Darussalam National Olympic Council |
| Federal Territories ^{2} | Federal Territories Sports Council |
| Johor | Johor State Sports Council |
| Kedah | Kedah State Sports Council |
| Kelantan | Kelantan State Sports Council |
| Malacca | Malacca State Sports Council |
| Negeri Sembilan | Negeri Sembilan State Sports Council |
| Pahang | Pahang State Sports Council |
| Penang | Penang State Sports Council |
| Perak | Perak State Sports Council |
| Perlis | Perlis State Sports Council |
| Sabah | Sabah State Sports Council |
| Sarawak | Sarawak State Sports Council |
| Selangor | Selangor State Sports Council |
| Terengganu | Terengganu State Sports Council |

Notes:

1. Not from within Malaysia, only invited to compete at the Sukma Games.

=== Former participating teams ===
| Entity | Sports Council |
|---|---|
| Kuala Lumpur ^{2} | Kuala Lumpur Sports Council |
| Labuan ^{2} | Labuan Sports Council |
| Malaysian Armed Forces (ATM/MAF) | Malaysian Armed Forces Sports Council |
| (Malaysia) Ministry of Higher Education | Malaysian University Sports Council (MASUM) |
| (Malaysia) Ministry of Education | Malaysian School Sports Council (MSSM) |
| Northern Territory ^{1} | Northern Territory Sports Academy |
| (Malaysia) Royal Malaysian Police (PDRM/RMP) | Royal Malaysian Police Sports Council |

Notes:

1. Not from within Malaysia. Sports Council known as Northern Territory Institute of Sport from 1996 until 2021.
2. Kuala Lumpur and Labuan participate as a combined Federal Territories team since 2006 Sukma Games and the 2026 Para Sukma Games.

== Sports ==
The list below shows the sports that are played at all the Sukma Games since 1986.

=== Core sports ===
- Aquatics
  - Diving
  - Swimming (1986
  - Synchronised swimming
  - Water polo (1986–
- Archery
- Athletics (1986–present)
- Badminton (1986–present)
- Basketball (1986
- Bowling
- Boxing
- Cycling (1986
- Fencing
- Football (1986–2010, 2012, 2014–present)
- Hockey (1986
- Golf
- Gymnastics
  - Artistic
  - Rhythmic
- Judo
- Karate
- Lawn bowls
- Netball (1986–
- Pencak silat
- Rugby union (1986–
- Rugby sevens
- Sailing
- Sepak takraw (1986
- Shooting
- Squash (1986
- Softball
- Table tennis (1986–
- Taekwondo
- Tennis (1986
- Volleyball
  - Beach
  - Indoor (1986–
- Weightlifting
- Wushu

=== Optional sports ===
- Beach soccer
- Bodybuilding
- Canoeing
- Chess
- Cricket (1986)
- Equestrian
- Futsal
- Handball
- Kabaddi
- Muay
- Pétanque
- Silambam

=== Sports by number of events ===
| Sport (Discipline) | Body World (Malaysia) | 02 | 04 | 06 | 08 | 10 | 11 | 12 | 13 | 14 | 16 | 18 | 22 | 24 | 26 |
|---|---|---|---|---|---|---|---|---|---|---|---|---|---|---|---|
| Artistic swimming | WAquatics (MAS) | | 4 | | | | 7 | | 7 | | | | | | |
| Diving | WAquatics (MAS) | 9 | 10 | 10 | 10 | 10 | | 10 | | 10 | 10 | 10 | 5 | 12 | 12 |
| Swimming | WAquatics (MAS) | 32 | 38 | 38 | 38 | 38 | | 38 | | 38 | 38 | 38 | 38 | 41 | 41 |
| Water polo | WAquatics (MAS) | | | | | | 2 | | 2 | | | | | | 2 |
| Archery | WArchery (NAAM) | 12 | 12 | 12 | 24 | 24 | | 24 | | 24 | 24 | 24 | 14 | 14 | 14 |
| Athletics | WAthletics (MAF) | 44 | 45 | 45 | 45 | 45 | | 45 | | 45 | 45 | 45 | 44 | 47 | 47 |
| Badminton | BWF (BAM) | 7 | 7 | 7 | 7 | 7 | | 7 | | 7 | 7 | 7 | 5 | 6 | 7 |
| 3x3 Basketball | FIBA (MABA) | | | | | | | | | | | 2 | 2 | 2 | 2 |
| Basketball | FIBA (MABA) | 2 | 2 | 2 | | 2 | 2 | | 1 | | | 2 | 2 | 2 | 2 |
| Bodybuilding | IFBB (MBBF) | | | | | | 6 | | 6 | | | | | | |
| Bowling | IBF (MTBC) | 13 | 13 | 13 | 13 | 13 | | 13 | | 13 | 11 | 11 | 11 | 11 | 11 |
| Boxing | IBA/ World Boxing (Disputed) (MBF) | 12 | 9 | 9 | 9 | 9 | | 9 | | 9 | 9 | 9 | 12 | 15 | 11 |
| Canoeing (sprint) | ICF (MASCA) | | | | 18 | 18 | 18 | | | 22 | | | 22 | | |
| Canoeing (slalom) | ICF (MASCA) | | | | | | | | | | | | 9 | | |
| Chess | FIDE (MCF) | | | | | | | | | | | | | 10 | 12 |
| Cricket | ICC (MCA) | | 1 | | | | | | 1 | | | 1 | 1 | 3 | 3 |
| BMX | UCI (MNCF) | | | | | | | 2 | | 2 | 2 | 2 | 2 | 2 | 4 |
| Mountain biking | UCI (MNCF) | 4 | 4 | 4 | 4 | 4 | | 4 | | 4 | 4 | 4 | 4 | 5 | 4 |
| Road cycling | UCI (MNCF) | 8 | 10 | 14 | 14 | 14 | | 12 | | 14 | 14 | 6 | 8 | 8 | 10 |
| Track cycling | UCI (MNCF) | | | | | | 16 | | | | | 12 | 16 | | 10 |
| Equestrian (Dressage) | FEI (EAM) | | | | 2 | 2 | | 2 | 2 | | | | | | |
| Equestrian (Jumping) | FEI (EAM) | | | | 2 | 2 | | 2 | 2 | | | | | | |
| Equestrian (Endurance) | FEI (EAM) | | | | 2 | 2 | | 2 | | | | | | | |
| E-sports | GEF (MESF) | | | | | | | | | | | | 5 | 7 | 13 |
| Fencing | FIE (MFF) | 12 | 12 | 12 | 12 | 12 | 12 | | 12 | | | | | 12 | 12 |
| Field hockey | FIH (MHC) | 2 | 2 | 2 | 2 | 2 | | 2 | | 2 | 2 | 2 | 2 | 2 | 2 |
| Football | FIFA (FAM) | 1 | 1 | 1 | 1 | 1 | | 1 | | 1 | 1 | 1 | 1 | 2 | 2 |
| Futsal | FIFA (FAM) | | | | | | 2 | | 2 | | | 2 | | 1 | 2 |
| Beach Football | FIFA (FAM) | | | | | | | | 1 | | | | | | |
| Golf | IGF (MGA) | 4 | 4 | 4 | 4 | 4 | | 4 | | 4 | 4 | 4 | 4 | 4 | 4 |
| Artistic | World Gymnastics (MGF) | 14 | 14 | 14 | 14 | 14 | | 14 | 14 | | 14 | 14 | 14 | 14 | 14 |
| Rhythmic | World Gymnastics (MGF) | 6 | 6 | 6 | 6 | 6 | | 6 | | 9 | 5 | 5 | 7 | 7 | 3 |
| Handball | IHF (MAHF) | | | | | | 2 | | 2 | | | 2 | | | |
| Judo | IJF (MJF) | 14 | 16 | | 8 | 16 | 16 | | 16 | | | 15 | 16 | 18 | 13 |
| Kabaddi | IKF (KAM) | | | | • | 2 | 2 | | 1 | | | | • | 2 | 2 |
| Karate | WKF (MAKAF) | 15 | 15 | 15 | 15 | 16 | | 16 | | 16 | 16 | 18 | 16 | 17 | 15 |
| Lawn bowls | WBowls (MLBF) | 4 | 4 | 8 | 8 | 8 | | 8 | | 8 | 8 | 9 | 9 | 9 | 9 |
| Muay thai | IFMA (MMA) | | | | | | | 15 | 15 | | | 15 | 16 | 18 | 12 |
| Netball | WNetball (MNA) | 1 | 1 | 1 | 1 | 1 | 1 | | 1 | | | 1 | 1 | 1 | 1 |
| Pencak silat | IPSF (PESAKA) | 19 | 23 | 23 | 23 | 23 | | 26 | | 26 | 26 | 26 | 26 | 28 | 28 |
| Pétanque | FIPJP (MBSF) | | | | 8 | 10 | | 11 | | 11 | 11 | 11 | 11 | 13 | 7 |
| Rowing | WRowing (PERDAMA) | | | | | | 9 | | 9 | | | | | | |
| Rugby sevens | WRugby (MRU) | | 1 | 1 | 1 | 1 | 1 | | 1 | | | 2 | 2 | 2 | 2 |
| Sailing | WSailing (MSA) | 3 | 3 | 5 | 7 | 10 | | 13 | | 13 | 12 | 13 | 14 | 14 | 10 |
| Sepak takraw | ISTAF (PSM) | 2 | 2 | 2 | 4 | 5 | | 6 | | 6 | 6 | 8 | 5 | 8 | 8 |
| Shooting | ISSF (NSAM) | 28 | 26 | 26 | 28 | 26 | | 26 | | 26 | 26 | 26 | 26 | 24 | 27 |
| Silambam | WSA (MSA) | | | | • | 13 | 17 | | 17 | | | | • | 14 | 14 |
| Softball | WBSC (SAM) | | | | | | 2 | | 2 | | | | | 2 | 2 |
| Squash | World Squash (SRAM) | 4 | 4 | 4 | 4 | 4 | | 4 | | 4 | 7 | 4 | 5 | 6 | 4 |
| Table tennis | ITTF (TTAM) | 7 | 7 | 7 | 7 | 7 | 6 | | 6 | | | | | 6 | 7 |
| Taekwondo | WTaekwondo (MTF) | 16 | 16 | 16 | 16 | | | 16 | | 16 | 19 | 19 | | 25 | 16 |
| Tennis | ITF (LTAM) | 7 | 7 | | 7 | 7 | 6 | | | 7 | 7 | | 5 | 6 | 7 |
| Traditional boat race | IDBF (MDBF) | | | | | | | | | | | | 2 | | |
| Volleyball (indoor) | FIVB (MAVA) | | 2 | | 2 | 2 | | 2 | 2 | | 2 | | 2 | 2 | 2 |
| Volleyball (beach) | FIVB (MAVA) | | | | 2 | 2 | 2 | | 2 | | | | 2 | 2 | 2 |
| Weightlifting | IWeightliftingF (MWF) | 27 | 27 | 48 | 16 | 32 | | 32 | | 32 | 32 | 32 | 16 | 16 | 16 |
| Woodball | IWBF (MWA) | | | | | | | | 6 | | | | | | |
| Wushu | IWUF (WFM) | 16 | 20 | 20 | 20 | 20 | | 20 | | 20 | 20 | 23 | 23 | 28 | 20 |
| Total events | | 345 | 368 | 369 | 404 | 434 | 129 | 377 | 130 | 389 | 382 | 427 | 426 | 488 | 468 |

== Medal table by edition ==
=== 1986 Sukma Games ===
* Host nation ( Kuala Lumpur)

1986 Sukma Games medal table
| Rank | State | Gold | Silver | Bronze | Total |
|---|---|---|---|---|---|
| 1 | (Malaysia) Kuala Lumpur* | 36 | 32 | 22 | 90 |
| 2 | Selangor | 23 | 14 | 14 | 51 |
| 3 | Sarawak | 13 | 8 | 14 | 35 |
| 4 | Perak | 10 | 15 | 17 | 42 |
| 5 | Penang | 9 | 20 | 21 | 50 |
| 6 | Sabah | 9 | 8 | 8 | 25 |
| 7 | Police | 9 | 4 | 7 | 20 |
| 8 | Johor | 6 | 5 | 6 | 17 |
| 9 | Kedah | 5 | 5 | 11 | 21 |
| 10 | Armed Forces | 2 | 8 | 11 | 21 |
| 11 | Malacca | 2 | 1 | 5 | 8 |
| 12 | Terengganu | 2 | 1 | 4 | 7 |
| 13 | Pahang | 1 | 4 | 6 | 11 |
| 14 | Negeri Sembilan | 0 | 1 | 4 | 5 |
| 15 | Kelantan | 0 | 1 | 1 | 2 |
| 16 | Perlis | 0 | 0 | 1 | 1 |
| Totals (16 entries) | | 127 | 127 | 152 | 406 |

=== 1988 Sukma Games ===
* Host nation ( Kuala Lumpur)

1988 Sukma Games medal table
| Rank | State | Gold | Silver | Bronze | Total |
|---|---|---|---|---|---|
| 1 | Selangor | 26 | 17 | 29 | 72 |
| 2 | Sarawak | 24 | 18 | 15 | 57 |
| 3 | Penang | 19 | 14 | 15 | 48 |
| 4 | (Malaysia) Kuala Lumpur* | 12 | 12 | 22 | 46 |
| 5 | Negeri Sembilan | 10 | 6 | 5 | 21 |
| 6 | Johor | 9 | 3 | 9 | 21 |
| 7 | Kedah | 6 | 6 | 8 | 20 |
| 8 | Police | 6 | 3 | 5 | 14 |
| 9 | Malacca | 5 | 7 | 4 | 16 |
| 10 | Sabah | 4 | 12 | 8 | 24 |
| 11 | (Malaysia) Universities | 4 | 4 | 8 | 16 |
| 12 | Perak | 3 | 20 | 21 | 44 |
| 13 | Terengganu | 2 | 2 | 4 | 8 |
| 14 | Kelantan | 1 | 3 | 7 | 11 |
| 15 | Pahang | 1 | 1 | 5 | 7 |
| 16 | Perlis | 1 | 0 | 5 | 6 |
| 17 | Armed Forces | 0 | 1 | 1 | 2 |
| Totals (17 entries) | | 133 | 129 | 171 | 433 |

=== 1990 Sukma Games ===
* Host nation (Sarawak)

1990 Sukma Games medal table
| Rank | State | Gold | Silver | Bronze | Total |
|---|---|---|---|---|---|
| 1 | Sarawak* | 44 | 17 | 18 | 79 |
| 2 | Kuala Lumpur | 19 | 20 | 18 | 57 |
| 3 | Penang | 17 | 22 | 24 | 63 |
| 4 | Perak | 12 | 16 | 22 | 50 |
| 5 | Selangor | 11 | 18 | 34 | 63 |
| 6 | Negeri Sembilan | 7 | 4 | 4 | 15 |
| 7 | Sabah | 5 | 4 | 10 | 19 |
| 8 | Malacca | 4 | 6 | 6 | 16 |
| 9 | Police | 4 | 4 | 2 | 10 |
| 9 | Terengganu | 4 | 4 | 2 | 10 |
| 11 | Kedah | 2 | 7 | 6 | 15 |
| 12 | Johor | 2 | 5 | 12 | 19 |
| 13 | Kelantan | 2 | 2 | 3 | 7 |
| 14 | Perlis | 1 | 0 | 7 | 8 |
| 15 | Pahang | 0 | 2 | 5 | 7 |
| 16 | (Malaysia) Universities | 0 | 2 | 1 | 3 |
| 17 | Armed Forces | 0 | 1 | 2 | 3 |
| Totals (17 entries) | | 134 | 134 | 176 | 444 |

=== 1992 Sukma Games ===
* Host nation (Johor)

1992 Sukma Games medal table
| Rank | State | Gold | Silver | Bronze | Total |
|---|---|---|---|---|---|
| 1 | Sarawak | 36 | 27 | 26 | 89 |
| 2 | Johor* | 26 | 21 | 22 | 69 |
| 3 | Selangor | 23 | 25 | 41 | 89 |
| 4 | Penang | 22 | 28 | 22 | 72 |
| 5 | Kuala Lumpur | 22 | 23 | 32 | 77 |
| 6 | Perak | 18 | 10 | 21 | 49 |
| 7 | Sabah | 9 | 16 | 13 | 38 |
| 8 | Malacca | 7 | 6 | 12 | 25 |
| 9 | Kedah | 6 | 7 | 8 | 21 |
| 10 | Negeri Sembilan | 6 | 5 | 3 | 14 |
| 11 | Armed Forces | 5 | 5 | 18 | 28 |
| 12 | Pahang | 5 | 5 | 8 | 18 |
| 13 | (Malaysia) Universities | 4 | 5 | 2 | 11 |
| 14 | Kelantan | 3 | 9 | 12 | 24 |
| 15 | Terengganu | 3 | 4 | 10 | 17 |
| 16 | Police | 2 | 1 | 5 | 8 |
| 17 | Perlis | 2 | 0 | 0 | 2 |
| Totals (17 entries) | | 199 | 197 | 255 | 651 |

=== 1994 Sukma Games ===
* Host nation (Perak)

1994 Sukma Games medal table
| Rank | State | Gold | Silver | Bronze | Total |
|---|---|---|---|---|---|
| 1 | Sarawak | 39 | 28 | 30 | 97 |
| 2 | Kuala Lumpur | 31 | 39 | 26 | 96 |
| 3 | Selangor | 28 | 41 | 33 | 102 |
| 4 | Perak* | 26 | 26 | 25 | 77 |
| 5 | Pahang | 21 | 16 | 20 | 57 |
| 6 | Sabah | 19 | 14 | 14 | 47 |
| 7 | Johor | 17 | 13 | 22 | 52 |
| 8 | Penang | 13 | 12 | 24 | 49 |
| 9 | Kedah | 8 | 5 | 20 | 33 |
| 10 | Kelantan | 6 | 6 | 10 | 22 |
| 11 | Armed Forces | 5 | 12 | 7 | 24 |
| 12 | Terengganu | 5 | 3 | 7 | 15 |
| 13 | Negeri Sembilan | 4 | 2 | 4 | 10 |
| 14 | Malacca | 4 | 1 | 10 | 15 |
| 15 | Police | 3 | 8 | 2 | 13 |
| 16 | Perlis | 1 | 0 | 8 | 9 |
| 17 | (Malaysia) Universities | 0 | 2 | 1 | 3 |
| Totals (17 entries) | | 230 | 228 | 263 | 721 |

=== 1996 Sukma Games ===
* Host nation (Pahang*)

1996 Sukma Games medal table
| Rank | State | Gold | Silver | Bronze | Total |
|---|---|---|---|---|---|
| 1 | Selangor | 57 | 43 | 44 | 144 |
| 2 | Sarawak | 56 | 49 | 52 | 157 |
| 3 | Pahang** | 37 | 42 | 44 | 123 |
| 4 | Kuala Lumpur | 34 | 27 | 32 | 93 |
| 5 | Perak | 22 | 25 | 28 | 75 |
| 6 | Sabah | 20 | 19 | 22 | 61 |
| 7 | Terengganu | 8 | 16 | 15 | 39 |
| 8 | Kelantan | 8 | 11 | 11 | 30 |
| 9 | Kedah | 8 | 6 | 18 | 32 |
| 10 | Negeri Sembilan | 6 | 4 | 10 | 20 |
| 11 | Penang | 5 | 10 | 10 | 25 |
| 12 | Malacca | 5 | 9 | 11 | 25 |
| 13 | (Malaysia) Universities | 4 | 0 | 0 | 4 |
| 14 | Johor | 2 | 7 | 17 | 26 |
| 15 | Perlis | 2 | 2 | 4 | 8 |
| 16 | Police | 1 | 3 | 8 | 12 |
| 17 | Brunei | 1 | 1 | 0 | 2 |
| 18 | (Malaysia) Schools | 1 | 0 | 2 | 3 |
| 19 | Labuan | 0 | 0 | 0 | 0 |
| Totals (19 entries) | | 277 | 274 | 328 | 879 |

=== 1998 Sukma Games ===
* Host nation (Selangor)

1998 Sukma Games medal table
| Rank | State | Gold | Silver | Bronze | Total |
|---|---|---|---|---|---|
| 1 | Selangor* | 80 | 61 | 41 | 182 |
| 2 | Sarawak | 46 | 45 | 41 | 132 |
| 3 | Perak | 25 | 25 | 37 | 87 |
| 4 | Kuala Lumpur | 23 | 25 | 26 | 74 |
| 5 | Pahang | 21 | 29 | 36 | 86 |
| 6 | Penang | 12 | 5 | 23 | 40 |
| 7 | Terengganu | 11 | 14 | 15 | 40 |
| 8 | Sabah | 11 | 10 | 12 | 33 |
| 9 | Kelantan | 11 | 9 | 10 | 30 |
| 10 | Kedah | 8 | 13 | 15 | 36 |
| 11 | Johor | 7 | 7 | 16 | 30 |
| 12 | Negeri Sembilan | 4 | 8 | 13 | 25 |
| 13 | Malacca | 4 | 8 | 11 | 23 |
| 14 | Perlis | 1 | 2 | 3 | 6 |
| 15 | Labuan | 0 | 0 | 2 | 2 |
| 15 | (Malaysia) Schools | 0 | 0 | 2 | 2 |
| Totals (16 entries) | | 264 | 261 | 303 | 828 |

=== 2000 Sukma Games ===
* Host nation (Host state (Penang))

2000 Sukma Games medal table
| Rank | State | Gold | Silver | Bronze | Total |
|---|---|---|---|---|---|
| 1 | Selangor | 53 | 56 | 54 | 163 |
| 2 | Sarawak | 49 | 55 | 56 | 160 |
| 3 | Perak | 46 | 37 | 40 | 123 |
| 4 | Penang* | 34 | 26 | 36 | 96 |
| 5 | Kuala Lumpur | 33 | 32 | 30 | 95 |
| 6 | Pahang | 27 | 26 | 35 | 88 |
| 7 | Johor | 20 | 17 | 31 | 68 |
| 8 | Kedah | 17 | 15 | 21 | 53 |
| 9 | Sabah | 12 | 11 | 18 | 41 |
| 10 | Negeri Sembilan | 12 | 10 | 13 | 35 |
| 11 | Kelantan | 8 | 12 | 15 | 35 |
| 12 | Malacca | 7 | 10 | 14 | 31 |
| 13 | Terengganu | 6 | 4 | 8 | 18 |
| 14 | Perlis | 4 | 5 | 5 | 14 |
| 15 | (Malaysia) Universities | 3 | 3 | 2 | 8 |
| 16 | (Malaysia) Schools | 1 | 1 | 3 | 5 |
| 17 | Brunei | 0 | 1 | 3 | 4 |
| 17 | Police | 0 | 1 | 3 | 4 |
| 19 | Labuan | 0 | 0 | 0 | 0 |
| Totals (19 entries) | | 332 | 322 | 387 | 1,041 |

== List of SUKMA Editions ==
Host cities of the games through 2018

| Edition | Year | Host | Main Stadium | Start Date | End Date | Opened by | Sports | Events | Teams | Competitors | Top state |
|---|---|---|---|---|---|---|---|---|---|---|---|
| I | 1986 | Kuala Lumpur | Stadium Merdeka | 19 April | 26 April | Sultan Abdul Halim | 16 | 123 | 16 | 3849 | (Malaysia) Kuala Lumpur |
| II | 1988 | Kuala Lumpur | Stadium Merdeka | 12 November | 19 November | Sports Minister Najib Razak | 17 | 133 | 17 | 4214 | Selangor |
| III | 1990 | Sarawak | Sarawak State Stadium, Kuching | 18 July | 27 July | 15 | 134 | 17 | 2849 | Sarawak | |
| IV | 1992 | Johor | Tan Sri Dato Haji Hassan Yunos Stadium, Johor Bahru | 1 July | 11 July | 22 | 199 | 17 | 5206 | Sarawak | |
| V | 1994 | Perak | Perak Stadium, Ipoh | 9 June | 18 June | 24 | 264 | 17 | 3956 | Sarawak | |
| VI | 1996 | Pahang | Darul Makmur Stadium, Kuantan | 1 June | 10 June | 25 | 277 | 19 | 5206 | Selangor | |
| VII | 1998 | Selangor | Opening ceremony Shah Alam Stadium; Closing ceremony Malawati Indoor Stadium | 17 April | 26 April | 24 | 264 | 16 | 3956 | Selangor | |
| VIII | 2000 | Penang | Batu Kawan Stadium, Batu Kawan | 25 May | 4 June | 29 | 332 | 19 | 5875 | Selangor | |
| IX | 2002 | Sabah | Likas Stadium, Kota Kinabalu | 7 September | 14 September | 27 | 347 | 20 | 5324 | Selangor | |
| X | 2004 | Negeri Sembilan | Tuanku Abdul Rahman Stadium, Seremban | 29 May | 6 June | 30 | | 17 | 6000 | Selangor | |
| XI | 2006 | Kedah | Darul Aman Stadium, Alor Star | 28 May | 4 June | 26 | 349 | 16 | 4882 | Selangor | |
| XII | 2008 | Terengganu | Sultan Mizan Zainal Abidin Stadium, Kuala Terengganu | 31 May | 9 June | 31 | 404 | 15 | 6000 | Terengganu | |
| XIII | 2010 | Malacca | Hang Jebat Stadium, Paya Rumput | 10 June | 19 June | 33 | 418 | 15 | 7000 | Terengganu | |
| XIV | 2011 | (Federal Territories of Malaysia) Kuala Lumpur | KLFA Stadium, Kuala Lumpur | 2 June | 12 June | 24 | 129 | 14 | 3368 | Terengganu | |
| XV | 2012 | Pahang | Darul Makmur Stadium, Kuantan | 9 July | 16 July | 24 | 393 | 15 | 5828 | Terengganu | |
| XVI | 2013 | (Federal Territories of Malaysia) Kuala Lumpur | NSC Mini Stadium, KL Sports City, Bukit Jalil, Kuala Lumpur | 28 June | 7 July | 23 | 130 | 14 | 3618 | Selangor | |
| XVII | 2014 | Perlis | Tuanku Syed Putra Stadium, Kangar | 24 May | 4 June | 24 | 389 | 15 | 7815 | (Federal Territories of Malaysia) Federal Territory | |
| XVIII | 2016 | Sarawak | Sarawak Stadium, Kuching | 23 July | 31 July | 24 | 382 | 15 | 5670 | Selangor | |
| XIX | 2018 | Perak | Perak Stadium, Ipoh | 11 September | 22 September | 29 | 427 | 15 | 7464 | Terengganu | |
| XX | 2022 | (Federal Territories of Malaysia) Kuala Lumpur | Dataran Gemilang, UKM, Bangi | 16 September | 24 September | 31 | 426 | 15 | 6606 | Johor | |
| XXI | 2024 | Sarawak | Opening ceremony Sarawak Stadium, Kuching; Closing ceremony Unity Stadium, Kuching | 17 August | 24 August | 37 | 488 | 15 | 9927 | Sarawak | |
| XXII | 2026 | Selangor | Opening ceremony Independence Square, Shah Alam; Closing ceremony MBPJ Stadium, Petaling Jaya | | | | | | | | |
| XXIII | 2028 | Kelantan | Bukit Merbau Stadium, Pasir Puteh (expected) | Future event | | | | | | | |
| XXIV | 2030 | MSN | | Future event | | | | | | | |
| XXV | 2032 | Sabah | Likas Stadium, Kota Kinabalu (expected) | Future event | | | | | | | |
| XXVI | 2034 | MSN | | Future event | | | | | | | |

== List of the Sukma Games' Sportsman and Sportswoman ==
| Edition | Year | Sukma Games' Sportsman | | | Sukma Games' Sportswoman | | |
| Edition | Year | Name | Contingent | Sport | Name | Contingent | Sport |
|---|---|---|---|---|---|---|---|
| III | 1990 | Gerard Liew | Penang | Swimming | Tania Hamid Bugo | Sarawak | Swimming |
| IV | 1992 | Khoo Kah Hock | (Malaysia) MASUM | Archery | Magdaline Goh | Penang | Swimming |
| IV | 1992 | Azmi Ibrahim (Most Promising Sportsman) | Pahang | Athletics | Shalin Zulkifli (Most Promising Sportswoman) | Selangor | Bowling |
| V | 1994 | Azmi Ibrahim | Pahang | Athletics | Yew Chai Peng | Perak | Athletics |
| VII | 1998 | Chai Song Lip | Sarawak | Athletics | Ho Hsu Ee | Kuala Lumpur | Swimming |
| VIII | 2000 | Allen Ong | Perak | Swimming | Sia Wai Yen | Kuala Lumpur | Swimming |
| IX | 2002 | Ng Shu Mun | Perak | Artistic gymnastics | Ngew Sin Mei | Kuala Lumpur | Athletics |
| IX | 2002 | Ng Shu Mun | Perak | Artistic gymnastics | Petra Nabila Mustafa (Most Promising Sportswoman) | Negeri Sembilan | Athletics |
| X | 2004 | Daniel Bego | Sarawak | Swimming | Cindy Ong | Perak | Swimming |
| XI | 2006 | Zulkifli Che Rose | Sarawak | Weightlifting | Lew Yih Wey | Negeri Sembilan | Swimming |
| XII | 2008 | Foo Jian Beng | Selangor | Swimming | Marellyn Liew | Sabah | Swimming |
| XIII | 2010 | J. Karthik | Malacca | Athletics | Chan Kah Yan | Federal Territory | Swimming |
| XIV | 2011 | Ahmad Shafie Abd Jabar | Johor | Canoeing | Jupha Somnet | Perlis | Cycling |
| XV | 2012 | Abdul Mubin Rahim | Terengganu | Weightlifting | Frenceay Titus | Sabah | Weightlifting |
| XVI | 2013 | Danniel Iskandar Richard | Selangor | Artistic gymnastics | Esmelda Arecia Menti Alfred Geling | Sarawak | Artistic gymnastics |
| XVII | 2014 | Muhammad Irfan Shamshuddin | Negeri Sembilan | Athletics | Jelinie Empera | Sarawak | Weightlifting |
| XVIII | 2016 | Khairul Hafiz Jantan | Malacca | Athletics | Nur Aqilah Yusof | Terengganu | Archery |
| XIX | 2018 | Eugenius Lo Foh Soon | Sabah | Archery | Azreen Nabila Alias | Terengganu | Athletics |
| XX | 2022 | Muhammad Fakhrullah Rumaize | Johor | Canoeing | Tan Rouxin | Johor | Swimming |
| XXI | 2024 | Andrew Goh Zheng Yen | Selangor | Swimming | Gan Chen Jie | Negeri Sembilan | Shooting |
| XXII | 2026 | Cheah Zen Hong | Pahang | Shooting | Eliza Tan Ai Shen | Selangor | Swimming |

== Para Sukma Games ==
Para Sukma Games (Malay: Para Sukan Malaysia), is a multi-sport event held for Malaysian athletes with disabilities. The games were previously known as the National Games of Malaysia For the Orthopaedically Handicapped (Malay: Sukan Kebangsaan Bagi Orang Cacat Anggota Malaysia) from 1982 until 1998 and the Paralimpiad Malaysia Games (Malay: Sukan Paralimpiad Malaysia) from 1998 until 2018 and held separately from the Sukma Games until 2010.

=== Outside Malaysia ===
In the 1990 to 1996 editions, several Southeast Asian countries also participated in the games. In the 2002 edition, several other Asian countries participated in the games.

Host cities of the games through 2018

=== Editions ===
| Games | Year | Host state | Sports | Contingent | Participants | Top state |
|---|---|---|---|---|---|---|
National Games of Malaysia For the Orthopaedically Handicapped
| I | 1982 | Kuala Lumpur | 2 | 14 | 550 | |
| II | 1984 | Selangor | 2 | 14 | 650 | |
| III | 1986 | Penang | 2 | 14 | 750 | |
| IV | 1988 | Kelantan | 2 | 15 | 828 | |
| V | 1990 | Malacca | 2 | 17 | 853 | |
| VI | 1992 | Terengganu | 2 | 17 | 980 | |
| VII | 1994 | Johor | 2 | 15 | 1200 | Sarawak |
| VII | 1996 | Sarawak | 2 | 18 | 978 | Sarawak |
Paralimpiad Malaysia Games
| IX | 1998 | Selangor | 10 | 14 | 877 | Sarawak |
| X | 2000 | (Federal Territories of Malaysia) Kuala Lumpur | 17 | 23 | 1239 | Sarawak |
| XI | 2002 | (Federal Territories of Malaysia) Kuala Lumpur | 16 | 23 | 937 | Sarawak |
| XII | 2004 | (Federal Territories of Malaysia) Kuala Lumpur | 20 | 15 | 1081 | Sarawak |
| XIII | 2006 | (Federal Territories of Malaysia) Kuala Lumpur | 16 | 15 | 1203 | Sarawak |
| XIV | 2008 | (Federal Territories of Malaysia) Kuala Lumpur | 16 | 15 | 1910 | Sarawak |
| XV | 2010 | Malacca | 16 | 15 | 1368 | Sarawak |
| XVI | 2012 | Pahang | 17 | 15 | 1900 | Sarawak |
| XVII | 2014 | Perlis | 9 | 15 | | Sarawak |
| XVIII | 2016 | Sarawak | 9 | 15 | 1500+ | Sarawak |
PARA SUKMA Games
| XIX | 2018 | Perak | 10 | 15 | 1968 | Sarawak |
| XX | 2022 | (Federal Territories of Malaysia) Kuala Lumpur | 10 | 15 | 1824 | Sabah |
| XXI | 2024 | Sarawak | 10 | 15 | 1994 | Sarawak |

== List of the Para SUKMA Games Sportsman and Sportswoman ==
| Edition | Year | Para Sukma Games' Sportsman | | | Para Sukma Games' Sportswoman | | |
| Edition | Year | Name | Contingent | Sport | Name | Contingent | Sport |
|---|---|---|---|---|---|---|---|
| XVIII | 2016 | Yoong Chung Wei | Penang | Para swimming | Carmen Lim | Selangor | Para swimming |
| XIX | 2018 | Jaklon Anak Ganding | Sabah | Para athletics | Nur Feiqha Maulad Binti Mohd Halil | Negeri Sembilan | Chess |
| XX | 2022 | Mohammad Zikri Zakaria | Malacca | Para athletics | Nur Jannaton Abdul Jalil | Perak | Para archery |
| XXI | 2024 | Shahafiq Abdullah | Sabah | Para swimming | Loh Chi Hui | Pahang | Para archery |
| XXII | 2026 | Muhammad Safwan Suhaimi | Selangor | Para swimming | Noshazwani Maisara Marzuki | Sarawak | Para athletics |

== Sopma Games ==
Sopma Games, officially the Malaysia Deaf Games (Malay: Sukan Orang Pekak Malaysia), is a national multi-sports event held biennially for deaf and hard-of-hearing athletes. Organised by the Malaysian Deaf Sports Association (MSDeaf), the games first started in 1985 to promote sportsmanship and unearth athletic talent among the deaf community. Initially an annual event held from 1985 to 1989 called the Inter-club Deaf Sports Championship (Malay: Kejohanan Sukan Antara Kelab Pekak, KSAKP), it transformed into a biennial event called the National Deaf Games (Malay: Sukan Kebangsaan Orang Pekak, SKOP) from 1991 to 2006, before it became known by its present name since 2009. Since 2016, the Sopma Games has always been held at the same venue as the Sukma and Para Sukma Games.

== See also ==
- Sport in Malaysia
- Malaysia at the Olympics
- Malaysia at the Asian Games
- Malaysia at the Commonwealth Games
