= 2006 Sukma Games =

Multi-sport event in Kedah, Malaysia

XI Sukma Games
- Host city: Kedah
- Motto: Sukan Cemerlang, Negara Terbilang (Excellent sports, glorious nation)
- Teams: 16
- Athletes: 4882
- Events: 26 sports
- Opening: 28 May
- Closing: 4 June
- Opened by: Abdul Halim; Sultan of Kedah
- Main venue: Darul Aman Stadium
- Website: 2006 Sukma Games

The 2006 Sukma Games, officially known as the 11th Sukma Games, was a Malaysian multi-sport event held in Kedah from 28 May to 4 June 2006. Negeri Sembilan weightlifter Zulkifli Che Rose and Negeri Sembilan swimmer Lew Yih Wey were announced as the Best Sportsman and Best Sportswoman of the event, respectively.

== Development and preparation ==
The 11th Sukma Games Organising Committee was formed to oversee the staging of the event.

=== Venues ===
The 2006 Sukma Games used a mix of new and existing venues. Most venues were existing public-sporting facilities, while others were newly constructed venues. Some retrofitting work were done at venues which were more than a decade old. They reverted to public use after the Games.

At the centrepiece of the activities was the upgraded 40,000-seat Darul Aman Stadium, which hosted most of the events. A games village was not built, instead athletes and officials were housed in universities throughout Kedah. Besides being physically near to the sport venues, it was hoped that this approach would add vibe to the city and reduce post-games costs in converting a dedicated games village to other uses.

The 11th Sukma Games had 24 venues for the games. 12 in Kota Setar, 4 each in Kuala Muda and Kubang Pasu and 1 each in Langkawi, Padang Terap and Pendang.

District	Competition Venue	Sports
Kota Setar	Darul Aman Stadium, Alor Setar	Athletics, Football, Opening and Closing Ceremony
Kota Setar	Youth And Sports Complex	Weightlifting
Kota Setar	Sultan Abdul Halim Stadium	Gymnastics, Badminton
Kota Setar	Keat Hwa Girls High School	Fencing
Kota Setar	Muadzam Shah Sports Complex	Women's Hockey, Squash
Kota Setar	Sultan Muadzam Shah Hall, Insaniah, Mergong	Pencak silat
Kota Setar	Mount Keriang Aquatic Centre	Aquatics
Kota Setar	MADA Headquarters Football Field	Football
Kota Setar	Yih Min Primary School, Simpang Empat, Alor Setar	Basketball
Kota Setar	Green Building Darul Aman	Lawn Bowl
Kota Setar	Sultan Abdul Hamid College, Alor Setar	Rugby
Kota Setar	Pokok Sena Shooting Range	Shooting
Kuala Muda	Sultan Abdul Hamid Sports Complex	Men's Hockey
Kuala Muda	Lip Seang Kor Morality Hall, Sungai Petani	Karate, Taekwondo
Kuala Muda	Modenas Kriss Sports Complex, Gurun	Table tennis, Wushu
Kuala Muda	Ampang Superbowl Sungai Petani, Central Square	Bowling
Kubang Pasu	Darul Aman Golf & Country Club	Golf
Kubang Pasu	Universiti Utara Malaysia	Archery, Football, Netball
Kubang Pasu	Darulaman Football Field, Jitra	Football
Kubang Pasu	Wawasan Hall	Sepak takraw
Langkawi	Langkawi water	Sailing
Padang Terap	Kuala Nerang	Cycling
Pendang	Rakan Muda Sports Complex, Tanah Merah	Boxing

== Marketing ==
=== Logo ===
Eagle, The official mascot of the games.

The logo of the 2006 Sukma Games is an image of a human in movement which represents the activeness and fitness of the athletes participating at the games. The colour Yellow and green represents the games host state, Kedah, the colour red represents the fighting spirit of the athletes and colour blue represents the greatness and sincerity of the athletes.

=== Mascot ===
The mascot of the 2006 Sukma Games is a nameless Eagle. It is said that the eagle is the state bird of Kedah and one of the prevalent species in Kedah especially in Langkawi where an eagle sculpture was erected in the Eagle Square (Dataran Helang) to symbolise the island. The adoption of eagle as the games' mascot is to represent the fighting spirit of the athletes participating at the games.

=== Motto ===
The official motto of the games is "Sukan Cemerlang Negara Terbilang" which means Excellence in sports, Glorify the nation.

== The games ==
=== Participating states ===
- Johor
- Kedah
- Kelantan
- Malacca
- Negeri Sembilan
- Pahang
- Penang
- Perak
- Perlis
- Sabah
- Sarawak
- Selangor
- Terengganu
- Federal Territory
- Police
- Brunei

=== Sports ===
- Swimming
- Archery
- Athletics
- Badminton
- Basketball
- Bowling
- Boxing
- Cycling
- Fencing
- Football
- Golf
- Gymnastics
- Hockey
- Karate
- Lawn bowls
- Netball
- Sepak takraw
- Shooting
- Pencak silat
- Rugby sevens
- Squash
- Sailing
- Taekwondo
- Table tennis
- Wushu
- Weightlifting

=== Medal table ===
* Host nation (Kedah)

2006 Sukma Games medal table
Rank	State	Gold	Silver	Bronze	Total
1	Selangor	53	44	56	153
2	Pahang	39	36	32	107
3	Perak	37	25	33	95
4	Sarawak	36	42	55	133
5	Penang	36	40	52	128
6	Kedah*	30	34	37	101
7	Sabah	26	26	29	81
8	Federal Territory	25	31	35	91
9	Kelantan	21	13	8	42
10	Negeri Sembilan	20	16	25	61
11	Johor	19	18	28	65
12	Terengganu	15	16	18	49
13	Malacca	11	15	13	39
14	Police	2	9	7	18
15	Brunei	0	3	5	8
16	Perlis	0	0	6	6
Totals (16 entries)		370	368	439	1,177

== Broadcasting ==
Radio Televisyen Malaysia was responsible for live streaming of several events, opening and closing ceremony of the games.

== Concerns and controversies ==
- On 28 May 2006, the Kedah state team lost a Gold medal after it was found out that Linvern Lim Yu Zheng represented Kedah as a Negeri Sembilan citizen. The Kedah state team deliberately took him for the Swimming event and was found not to obey the Games rules. Lim Yu Zheng previously represented Negeri Sembilan in the two previous Sukma Games.
- On 4 June 2006, An athlete failed a doping test.
- On 28 May 2006, a power shortage occurred at several Sukma Games venues in Kedah. At the Mount Keriang Aquatic Centre, the electronic scoreboard suffered some damage when the diving event was about to begin at 11 am. At the Squash centre in Muadzam Shah Sports Complex, the power shortage occurred at 4:40 pm, which caused the following events to be delayed.

Preceded by Negeri Sembilan	Sukma Games; Kedah; XI Sukma Games (2006)	Succeeded by Terengganu
