= 2004 Sukma Games =

Multi-sport event in Malaysia

X Sukma Games
- Host city: Negeri Sembilan
- Motto: Atlet cemerlang, Negara gemilang (Excellent athletes for a glorious nation)
- Teams: 17
- Athletes: 6000
- Events: 30 sports
- Opening: 29 May
- Closing: 6 June
- Opened by: Tuanku Jaafar; Yang di-Pertuan Besar
- Main venue: Tuanku Abdul Rahman Stadium, Paroi, Seremban
- Website: 2004 Sukma Games

The 2004 Sukma Games, officially known as the 10th Sukma Games, was a Malaysian multi-sport event held in Negeri Sembilan from 29 May to 6 June 2004. Sarawakian swimmer Daniel Bego and Perakian swimmer Cindy Ong were announced as the Best Sportsman and Best Sportswoman of the event, respectively.

== Development and preparation ==
The 10th Sukma Games Organizing Committee was formed to oversee the staging of the event. According to the Menteri Besar of Negeri Sembilan, Dato' Seri Utama Haji Mohamad bin Haji Hasan, the state government spent around RM170 million to organize the event. Around RM132.6 million out of that amount was allocated for the renovation and upgrading of the stadium and facilities. The actual cost of organizing the sports event was around RM36 million.

Major construction took place, especially in the hub of the sports complex in Paroi, such as the renovation of Tuanku Abdul Rahman Stadium and the construction of the new aquatic complex, which began in 2002. There was a major upgrade for the state hockey stadium and Tan Sri Dr. Mohamed Said bowling complex in Seremban 2.

=== Venues ===
The 2004 Sukma Games used a mix of new and existing venues. Most venues were existing public-sporting facilities, while others were newly constructed venues. Some retrofitting work was done in venues that are more than a decade old. They will be returned to public use after the games.

The centerpiece of the activities was the upgraded 45,000-seat Tuanku Abdul Rahman Stadium, which hosts most of the events. A games village was not built; instead, athletes and officials were housed in universities, apartments, and hotels throughout Negeri Sembilan.

Besides being physically near the sports venues, it was hoped that it would add vibe to the city and reduce post-game costs by converting a dedicated games village to other uses.

The 10th Sukma Games had 31 venues for the games. 22 in Seremban, four in Port Dickson, three in Kuala Pilah and two in Rembau.

District	Competition Venue	Sports
Seremban	Tuanku Abdul Rahman Stadium	Athletics, Football, Opening and closing ceremony
Seremban	King George V School, Seremban	Football
Seremban	Padang Rahang Square	Football
Seremban	Taman Tuanku Jaafar High School	Football
Seremban	Raja Melewar teaching institute	Football
Seremban	Paroi Swimming Complex	Swimming, Diving, Synchronized Swimming
Seremban	Negeri Sembilan Chinese Recreation Club Hall	Badminton
Seremban	Paroi Sports Complex Center Court	Sepak Takraw, Boxing, Netball
Seremban	Seremban International Golf Club, Seremban	Golf
Seremban	Nilai Indoor Stadium	Gymnastics
Seremban	Seremban Municipal Council Hall	Karate, Pencak silat
Seremban	Seremban Astroturf Stadium	Hockey
Seremban	Seremban Municipal Council Negeri Sembilan Field	Cricket
Seremban	Seremban Golden Bowl	Bowling
Seremban	Staffield Country Resort, Seremban	Squash
Seremban	Nilai Spring Field	Squash
Seremban	Youth and Sports Complex, Paroi	Tennis
Seremban	Chung Hwa High School, Seremban	Table tennis, Wushu
Seremban	Galla Shooting Range, Mantin	Shooting
Seremban	Seremban bowling field	Lawn bowls
Seremban	Tuanku Jaafar College	Cricket
Seremban	Dusun Nyior High School	Cricket
Port Dickson	Port Dickson-Seremban Highway	Cycling (Road)
Port Dickson	Royal Port Dickson Yacht Club	Sailing
Port Dickson	Rakan Muda Sports Center	Taekwondo
Port Dickson	Port Dickson Basketball Hall	Basketball
Kuala Pilah	Chung Hua High School, Kuala Pilah	Volleyball
Kuala Pilah	Ulu Bendul, Kuala Pilah	Cycling (Mountain bike)
Kuala Pilah	Tuanku Muhammad High School	Rugby
Rembau	National Youth Skills Institute (IBKN) Hall, Chembong	Judo, Fencing, Weightlifting
Rembau	SMKA Pedas	Archery

== Marketing ==
=== Logo ===
Deer, the Official Mascot of the 2004 Sukma Games.

The logo of the 2004 Sukma Games is a geometrically shaped image. Three geometrical objects resembling the three athletes standing together to hold the torch up represent the unity of Malaysia through sports, which is concurrent with the Sukma Games objective, which is to improve unity and integration of nationality among the various communities in Malaysia. The three athletes also represent the champion, runner-up, and second runner-up positions, which is the goal of every athlete.

The torch signifies the strength and competitive spirit of the athlete to achieve victory in every event. The four color's used in the game's logo are red, which represents the strength and spirit needed to achieve victory; yellow, which represents sovereign rights and harmony in Negeri Sembilan; blue, which represents unity and national integration; and black, which represents the traditional rule of Negeri Sembilan State under the Adat Perpatih norm.

=== Mascot ===
The mascot of the 2004 Sukma Games is a nameless deer. It was a 'royalty hunt' in the glory days of the Malay Sultanate of Malacca and is now a symbol of Negeri Sembilan and one of the prevalent species in Malaysia. The mascot's adoption is meant to promote the state's eco-tourism.

== The games ==
=== Participating states ===
- Johor
- Kedah
- Kelantan
- Malacca
- Negeri Sembilan
- Pahang
- Penang
- Perak
- Perlis
- Sabah
- Sarawak
- Selangor
- Terengganu
- Kuala Lumpur
- Labuan
- Police
- Brunei

=== Sports ===
- Aquatics
  - Diving
  - Swimming
  - Synchronized swimming
- Archery
- Athletics
- Badminton
- Basketball
- Bowling
- Boxing
- Cricket
- Cycling
- Fencing
- Football
- Golf
- Gymnastics
- Hockey
- Judo
- Karate
- Lawn bowls
- Netball
- Sepak takraw
- Shooting
- Pencak silat
- Rugby sevens
- Squash
- Sailing
- Taekwondo
- Table tennis
- Tennis
- Wushu
- Weightlifting
- Volleyball

=== Medal table ===
A total of 1202 medals, comprising 370 gold medals, 368 silver medals, and 464 bronze medals, were awarded to athletes. The host, Negeri Sembilan's performance, was their best ever yet and placed tenth overall among participating states.

* Host nation (Negeri Sembilan)

2004 Sukma Games medal table
Rank	State	Gold	Silver	Bronze	Total
1	Selangor	56	58	52	166
2	Sarawak	53	56	44	153
3	Perak	47	35	50	132
4	Penang	36	35	61	132
5	Kuala Lumpur	33	29	42	104
6	Johor	27	31	29	87
7	Pahang	27	17	35	79
8	Malacca	24	16	25	65
9	Sabah	21	28	37	86
10	Negeri Sembilan*	20	18	23	61
11	Kedah	13	19	21	53
12	Terengganu	6	9	15	30
13	Kelantan	4	7	10	21
14	Police	2	2	4	8
15	Brunei	1	5	5	11
16	Perlis	0	2	6	8
17	Labuan	0	1	5	6
Totals (17 entries)		370	368	464	1,202

== Broadcasting ==
Radio Televisyen Malaysia was responsible for live streaming of several events, including the opening and closing ceremonies of the games.

Preceded by Sabah	Sukma Games; Negeri Sembilan; X Sukma Games (2004)	Succeeded by Kedah
