= 2013–2014 Sukma Games =

Multi-sport event in Malaysia

XVI Sukma Games
- Host city: Kuala Lumpur
- Teams: 14
- Athletes: 3618
- Events: 130 in 18 sports
- Opening: 28 June
- Closing: 7 July
- Opened by: Muhyiddin Yassin; Deputy Prime Minister of Malaysia
- Main venue: Bukit Jalil National Stadium
- Website: 2013 Sukma Games

XVII Sukma Games
- Host city: Perlis
- Motto: Seiring Menuju Kecemerlangan (Together Towards Excellence)
- Teams: 15
- Athletes: 7815
- Events: 389 in 24 sports
- Opening: 26 May
- Closing: 4 June
- Opened by: Syed Sirajuddin; Raja of Perlis
- Main venue: Tuanku Syed Putra Stadium
- Website: 2014 Sukma Games

From 2011 to 2014, the Sukma Games had been held annually, with the National Sports Council holding the games every odd year in Kuala Lumpur, and the state holding the games every even year. The odd year Sukma Games featured only optional sports while the even year Sukma Games featured only core sports.

The 2013 Sukma Games, officially known as the 16th Sukma Games, were held from 28 June to 7 July 2013 and featured 130 events in 18 optional sports, whereas the 2014 Sukma Games, officially known as the 17th Sukma Games, were held in Perlis from 26 May to 9 June 2014 and featured 389 events in 24 core sports.

On 25 February 2015, sports minister, Khairy Jamaluddin announced that the odd year Sukma Games has been abolished, citing fully packed state sports agenda and high cost for state sport councils to fund a Sukma Games contingent every year.

== Organisation ==
=== Venues ===
The 17th Sukma Games had 16 venues for the games, while the 16th Sukma Games had 11 venues for the games, 5 in Kuala Lumpur and 6 in Selangor.

17th Sukma Games

State	Competition Venue	Sports
Perlis
Perlis	Sungai Batu Pahat	Shooting
Perlis	Tuanku Syed Putra Stadium	Aquatics, Badminton, Squash, Tennis, Boxing, Wushu, Pencak Silat
Perlis	2020 Hall	Sepak takraw
Perlis	Kayangan Square	Bowling
Perlis	IKBN Kuala Perlis	Weightlifting
Perlis	Tuanku Syed Sirajuddin Polytechnic	Archery, Gymnastics (Rhythmic)
Perlis	Perlis Matriculation College	Karate, Taekwando
Perlis	Timah Tasoh Lake	Canoe, Sailing
Perlis	Sungai Batu Pahat	Cycling (BMX Bike), Golf
Perlis	Tuanku Syed Putra Stadium	Lawn bowl, Men's hockey, Athletics, Petanque, Football (semi-final, Final)
Perlis	SMK Kuala Perlis	Women's hockey
Perlis	Felda Chuping	Cycling (criterium, road cycling)
Perlis	Pauh	Cycling (cross-country, mountain bike)
Perlis	Syed Sirajuddin Areeb Putra Sports Complex	Football
Perlis	UiTM Perlis	Football
Perlis	Kuala Perlis-Changlun Highway	Cycling (sprint)

16th Sukma Games

State	Competition Venue	Sports
Kuala Lumpur	South City Plaza, Seri Kembangan	Bodybuilding, Muay Thai
Kuala Lumpur	National Sports Complex, Malaysia	Handball, Volleyball, Kabaddi, Fencing, Water polo, Silambam
Kuala Lumpur	OCM Indoor Sports Arena, Jalan Hang Jebat	Judo, Table tennis
Kuala Lumpur	Bukit Kiara Sports Complex	Netball
Kuala Lumpur	MABA Basketball Stadium	Basketball
Selangor	MBSA Volleyball Hall	Volleyball
Selangor	Selangor Turf Club	Equestrian, Cricket
Selangor	Morib Beach MDKL Court	Beach Football
Selangor	Kinara Oval	Cricket
Selangor	Universiti Putra Malaysia	Rugby, Softball
Selangor	Panasonic Sports Complex	Futsal

== Marketing ==
=== Logo ===
Singa Utara, the lion, The Official Mascot of the 2014 Sukma Games.

Harimau Muda, the tiger, The Official Mascot of the 2013 Sukma Games.

The logo of the 2014 Sukma Games is an image of a lion consists of four colours which are Yellow, blue, red and white. Yellow represents enthusiasm, Blue represents unity and harmony in sports, Red represents the fighting spirit, insistence and the bravery in facing challenges and White represents solemnity, pure soul and sincerity.

=== Mascot ===
The official mascot of the 2014 Sukma Games is a lion named "Singa Utara" (Northern Lion). Despite the fact that the lion does not exist in Malaysia, the lion is regarded as the icon and state identity of Perlis. Its adoption as the games' mascot is to reflect the courage, agility, activeness and intelligence characteristic of the participating athletes and the caring characteristics of the Perlis citizens. Meanwhile, the mascot of the 2013 Sukma Games is a tiger named Harimau Muda (Youth Tiger), which was also the mascot of the 2011 Sukma Games.

=== Songs ===
The theme Song of the 2014 Sukma Games is "Seiring Menuju Kecemerlangan" (Together Towards Excellence).

== The games ==
=== Participating states ===
2013–2014 Sukma Games

- Johor
- Kedah
- Kelantan
- Malacca
- Negeri Sembilan
- Pahang
- Penang
- Perak
- Perlis
- Sabah
- Sarawak
- Selangor
- Terengganu
- Federal Territory

2014 Sukma Games only

- Brunei

=== Sports ===
2013 Sukma Games

- Aquatics
  - Water polo
- Basketball
- Beach football
- Bodybuilding
- Cricket
- Equestrian
- Fencing
- Futsal
- Handball
- Judo
- Kabaddi
- Muay
- Netball
- Rugby union
- Softball
- Silambam
- Table tennis
- Volleyball

2014 Sukma Games

- Aquatics
  - Diving (10)
  - Swimming (38)
- Archery (24)
- Athletics (45)
- Badminton (7)
- Bowling (13)
- Boxing (9)
- Canoeing (22)
- Cycling
  - BMX racing (2)
  - Mountain biking (4)
  - Road (14)
- Football (1)
- Golf (4)
- Gymnastics
  - Rhythmic (9)
- Field hockey (2)
- Karate (16)
- Lawn bowls (8)
- Pencak silat (26)
- Petanque (11)
- Sailing (13)
- Sepak takraw (6)
- Shooting (26)
- Squash (4)
- Taekwondo (16)
- Tennis (7)
- Weightlifting (32)
- Wushu (20)

=== Medal table ===
* Host nation (Federal Territory)

2013 Sukma Games medal table
Rank	State	Gold	Silver	Bronze	Total
1	Selangor (SEL)	23	17	30	70
2	Terengganu (TER)	19	13	13	45
3	Federal Territory (WIL)*	15	20	27	62
4	Johor (JOH)	12	8	25	45
5	Negeri Sembilan (NSE)	11	13	15	39
6	Kedah (KED)	10	5	16	31
7	Penang (PEN)	8	19	21	48
8	Pahang (PAH)	8	5	6	19
9	Perak (PRK)	6	5	13	24
10	Kelantan (KEL)	6	2	3	11
11	Sarawak (SAR)	4	9	5	18
12	Sabah (SAB)	4	6	8	18
13	Malacca (MEL)	4	5	8	17
14	Perlis (PER)	0	3	4	7
Totals (14 entries)		130	130	194	454

* Host nation (Perlis)

2014 Sukma Games medal table
Rank	State	Gold	Silver	Bronze	Total
1	Federal Territory (WIL)	55	38	49	142
2	Terengganu (TER)	51	55	31	137
3	Sarawak (SAR)	48	32	35	115
4	Selangor (SEL)	36	49	71	156
5	Pahang (PAH)	33	27	33	93
6	Perak (PRK)	24	24	36	84
7	Penang (PEN)	24	21	30	75
8	Johor (JOH)	23	32	40	95
9	Sabah (SAB)	21	31	44	96
10	Negeri Sembilan (NSE)	18	26	24	68
11	Malacca (MEL)	16	12	17	45
12	Kedah (KED)	15	17	23	55
13	Kelantan (KEL)	12	14	6	32
14	Perlis (PER)*	12	10	30	52
15	Brunei (BRU)	1	0	0	1
Totals (15 entries)		389	388	469	1,246

* Host nation (Host state (Federal Territory and Perlis))

Combined
Rank	State	Gold	Silver	Bronze	Total
1	Terengganu (TER)	70	68	44	182
2	Federal Territory (WIL)*	70	58	76	204
3	Selangor (SEL)	59	66	101	226
4	Sarawak (SAR)	52	41	40	133
5	Pahang (PAH)	41	32	39	112
6	Johor (JOH)	35	40	65	140
7	Penang (PEN)	32	40	51	123
8	Perak (PRK)	30	29	49	108
9	Negeri Sembilan (NSE)	29	39	39	107
10	Sabah (SAB)	25	37	52	114
11	Kedah (KED)	25	22	39	86
12	Malacca (MEL)	20	17	25	62
13	Kelantan (KEL)	18	16	9	43
14	Perlis (PER)*	12	13	34	59
15	Brunei (BRU)	1	0	0	1
Totals (15 entries)		519	518	663	1,700

== Broadcasting ==
Radio Televisyen Malaysia was responsible for live streaming of several events, opening and closing ceremony of the games.

== Concerns and controversies ==
2013 Sukma Games

- At the 2013 Sukma Games, Malaysian Police have arrested three handball players on charges of raping a female officer of the women's handball squad at the Sukma Games Village in Malaysia. The victim alleged that she was raped on Wednesday at the sports village in Universiti Putra Malaysia (UPM) situated in Serdang district. The 19-year-old woman was in a semi-conscious state when she was repeatedly raped in a hostel room at the university.

2014 Sukma Games

- On 29 May, the canvas roof of the recently completed Aquatics Centre came down at 2pm on that day. The late completion of the complex had forced organisers to delay the swimming and diving events by a day. The aquatics competition was initially scheduled to start on Wednesday. Sports minister Khairy Jamaluddin had gone to the site to witness the situation. The roof is then removed and the competition continues.
- On complaints that tenpin bowling athletes had to play until the wee hours of the morning, all contingents were notified that the bowling centre for the 17th Sukma had only 24 lanes, and the competition had to be extended. The first day of the tenpin bowling competition at the Kayangan Mall on 27 May was delayed for three hours due to power failure while on Monday, the team event had to be extended until the small hour of the morning due to damaged lanes.
- In addition to the construction delayed for the Indoor Stadium, audience attended badminton games held on 31 May annoyed by water leaking from the roof at the newly built Indoor Badminton Stadium. Leaks were spotted at different parts of the Badminton hall near the seats. But, fortunately did not interrupted the games.
- 5 athletes were downed with minor food poisoning.

== Related events ==
=== Paralympiad Malaysia ===
Logo

21 to 25 August 2014.

State	Competition Venue	Sports
Perlis	Tuanku Syed Putra Stadium	Swimming, Badminton, Archery, Lawn Bowls, Athletics, Wheelchair Basketball, Wheelchair Tennis, Table Tennis
Perlis	Perlis State Sports Council Hall	Powerlifting
Perlis	Universiti Teknologi MARA	Opening ceremony
Perlis	2020 Hall	Closing ceremony

* Host nation (Perlis)

2014 Paralympiad Malaysia medal table
Rank	State	Gold	Silver	Bronze	Total
1	Sarawak	66	55	44	165
2	Terengganu	40	16	17	73
3	Johor	29	17	10	56
4	Sabah	24	17	17	58
5	Kedah	17	14	23	54
6	Federal Territory	16	19	21	56
7	Perlis*	15	12	4	31
8	Perak	14	16	15	45
9	Penang	11	15	15	41
10	Malacca	11	13	12	36
11	Selangor	10	10	10	30
12	Kelantan	9	10	7	26
13	Negeri Sembilan	6	11	9	26
14	Pahang	5	6	10	21
15	Labuan	2	3	5	10
Totals (15 entries)		275	234	219	728

Preceded by Kuala Lumpur and Pahang	Sukma Games; Kuala Lumpur and Perlis; XVI and XVII Sukma Games (2013 and 2014)	Succeeded by Sarawak
