= 2011–2012 Sukma Games =

Multi-sport event in Malaysia

XIV Sukma Games
- Host city: Kuala Lumpur
- Teams: 14
- Athletes: 3368
- Events: 19 sports
- Opening: 2 June
- Closing: 12 June
- Opened by: Muhyiddin Yassin; Deputy Prime Minister of Malaysia
- Main venue: KLFA Stadium
- Website: 2011 Sukma Games

XV Sukma Games
- Host city: Pahang
- Motto: Sukan Menjana Perpaduan (Sports Generates Unity)
- Teams: 15
- Athletes: 5828
- Events: 24 sports
- Opening: 9 July
- Closing: 16 July
- Opened by: Ahmad Shah; Sultan of Pahang
- Main venue: Darul Makmur Stadium
- Website: 2012 Sukma Games

On 27 May 2010, the National Sports Council of Malaysia had decided the Sukma Games would be held annually, with the National Sports Council holding the games every odd year in Kuala Lumpur, and the state holding the games every even year. It was also decided that the odd year Sukma Games would only feature optional sports while the even year Sukma Games would include 19 core sports and 5 optional sports.

The 2011 Sukma Games, officially known as the 14th Sukma Games, were held from 2 to 12 June 2011 and featured 19 optional sports, whereas the 2012 Sukma Games, officially known as the 15th Sukma Games, were held in Pahang from 9 to 16 July 2012 and featured 24 sports.

== Organisation ==
=== Venues ===
The 15th Sukma Games had 19 venues for the games, 17 in Kuantan and 1 each in Temerloh and Pekan respectively. while the 14th Sukma Games had 13 venues for the games, 7 in Kuala Lumpur, 5 in Selangor and 1 in Putrajaya respectively.

15th Sukma Games

District	Competition Venue	Sports
Kuantan	Darul Makmur Stadium	Athletics, Opening and Closing Ceremony
Kuantan	Youth Building	Aquatics (Swimming, Diving), Hockey (Men)
Kuantan	Tanah Putih High School	Volleyball (Women)
Kuantan	Chung Ching Primary School	Volleyball (Men)
Kuantan	Mega Lanes Bowling Centre, Mega Mall	Bowling
Kuantan	Royal Pahang Golf Club	Golf
Kuantan	SUKPA Stadium	Badminton, Gymnastics, Lawn bowls, Shooting, Hockey (Female)
Kuantan	Air Balok Recreation Center	Sailing
Kuantan	Balok Petanque Court	Petanque
Kuantan	International Islamic University Malaysia	Sepak takraw
Kuantan	Kuantan Municipal Council Football Field	Football
Kuantan	Tanjung Lumpur Equestrian Center	Equestrian
Kuantan	Taman Gelora Squash Court	Squash
Kuantan	Politeknik Sultan Haji Ahmad Shah	Archery
Kuantan	Universiti Malaysia Pahang	Karate, Taekwondo, Wushu
Kuantan	National Youth Skills Institute Lanchang	Pencak silat
Kuantan	Bukit Rangin High School	Boxing
Temerloh	Temerloh	Cycling
Pekan	Sultan Haji Ahmad Shah Convention Hall	Weightlifting

14th Sukma Games

State	Competition Venue	Sports
Kuala Lumpur	Bukit Jalil National Stadium	Aquatics (Water Polo, Synchronised Swimming), Judo, Kabaddi, Fencing, Table tennis, Silambam, Handball
Kuala Lumpur	Malaysia Basketball Association Stadium	Basketball
Kuala Lumpur	Jalan Duta Tennis Complex	Tennis
Kuala Lumpur	Cheras Velodrome	Cycling (Track)
Kuala Lumpur	South City Plaza, Sri Kembangan	Bodybuilding
Kuala Lumpur	University of Malaya	Rugby
Kuala Lumpur	Bukit Kiara Sports Complex	Netball
Selangor	Panasonic Sports Complex	Futsal
Selangor	Shah Alam City Council Stadium	Volleyball (Beech)
Selangor	Kinnara Oval	Cricket
Selangor	Selangor Turf Club	Cricket
Selangor	Universiti Putra Malaysia	Softball
Putrajaya	Water Sports Complex	Canoe, Rowing

== Marketing ==
=== Logo ===
Tahan, Rajah, Teku and Putih, the elephant, the official mascot of the 2012 games.

Harimau Muda, the tiger, the official mascot of the 2011 games.

The Logo of the 2012 Sukma Games is an image of the elephant, a symbol of Pahang. Besides representing Pahang, the elephant represents the welcoming of the arrival of all participating states from Malaysia. There are five colours on the logo, the black and white represents the state of Pahang, the red represents the fighting spirit of all participating athletes in achieving victory, the blue represents the sporting and unity spirit of all Malaysians and the yellow represents Pahang as a sovereign constitutional monarchy and the pride, the cheers and the honour of all people involved in making the 2012 Sukma Games a success. Overall, it represents the prosperous Pahang and the welcoming of all participating states and Malaysians to Pahang as host of the games.

=== Mascot ===
The mascots of the 2012 Sukma Games is a group of four elephants together as a family namely: Tahan (Father), Puteh (Mother), Rajah (Son), and Teku (Daughter), the four elephants are named after respective mountains found within Pahang. The adoption of elephant, the state symbol as the games' mascot is to promote the state's eco-tourism.

Meanwhile, the mascot of the 2011 Sukma Games is a Malayan tiger named Harimau Muda (Youth Tiger).

=== Songs ===
The theme song of the 2012 Sukma Games is "Satu Tujuan" (One Aim).

== The games ==
=== Participating states ===
2011–2012 Sukma Games

- Johor
- Kedah
- Kelantan
- Malacca
- Negeri Sembilan
- Pahang
- Penang
- Perak
- Perlis
- Sabah
- Sarawak
- Selangor
- Terengganu
- Federal Territory

2012 Sukma Games only

- Brunei

=== Sports ===
2011 Sukma Games

- Aquatics
  - Water polo
  - Synchronised swimming
- Basketball
- Bodybuilding
- Canoeing
- Cricket
- Cycling
  - Track cycling
- Fencing
- Futsal
- Handball
- Judo
- Kabaddi
- Netball
- Rugby union
- Rowing
- Softball
- Silambam
- Table tennis
- Tennis
- Volleyball
  - Beech

2012 Sukma Games

- Aquatics
  - Diving
  - Swimming
- Archery
- Athletics
- Badminton
- Boxing
- Bowling
- Cycling
  - Road cycling
- Equestrian
- Football
- Golf
- Gymnastics
- Hockey
- Karate
- Lawn bowls
- Pencak silat
- Petanque
- Sailing
- Sepak takraw
- Shooting
- Squash
- Taekwondo
- Weightlifting
- Wushu
- Volleyball
  - Indoor

=== Medal table ===
2011 Sukma Games

* Host nation (Federal Territory)

2011 Sukma Games medal table
Rank	State	Gold	Silver	Bronze	Total
1	Terengganu	30	8	12	50
2	Selangor	26	18	28	72
3	Johor	21	20	12	53
4	Negeri Sembilan	16	11	19	46
5	Federal Territory*	7	24	33	64
6	Penang	6	10	12	28
7	Perlis	5	6	8	19
8	Sabah	4	5	13	22
9	Malacca	4	3	6	13
10	Kedah	4	2	11	17
11	Kelantan	3	2	1	6
12	Sarawak	2	4	8	14
13	Pahang	1	11	7	19
14	Perak	0	5	17	22
Totals (14 entries)		129	129	187	445

2012 Sukma Games

* Host nation (Pahang)

2012 Sukma Games medal table
Rank	State	Gold	Silver	Bronze	Total
1	Terengganu	62	24	31	117
2	Selangor	47	54	60	161
3	Pahang*	45	40	38	123
4	Sarawak	42	32	38	112
5	Federal Territory	37	41	45	123
6	Penang	32	18	21	71
7	Kedah	23	20	22	65
8	Johor	19	39	34	92
9	Negeri Sembilan	17	29	23	69
10	Sabah	17	21	52	90
11	Perak	14	26	38	78
12	Kelantan	13	10	16	39
13	Malacca	7	19	18	44
14	Perlis	4	5	12	21
15	Brunei	0	0	4	4
Totals (15 entries)		379	378	452	1,209

Combined

* Host nation (Host state (Federal Territory and Pahang))

Rank	State	Gold	Silver	Bronze	Total
1	Terengganu	92	32	43	167
2	Selangor	73	72	88	233
3	Pahang*	46	51	45	142
4	Federal Territory*	44	65	78	187
5	Sarawak	44	36	46	126
6	Johor	40	59	46	145
7	Penang	38	28	33	99
8	Negeri Sembilan	33	40	42	115
9	Kedah	27	22	33	82
10	Sabah	21	26	65	112
11	Kelantan	16	12	17	45
12	Perak	14	31	55	100
13	Malacca	11	22	24	57
14	Perlis	9	11	20	40
15	Brunei	0	0	4	4
Totals (15 entries)		508	507	639	1,654

== Broadcasting ==
Radio Televisyen Malaysia was responsible for live streaming of several events, opening and closing ceremony of the games.

== Concerns and controversies ==
- On 9 July, 12 Johor women hockey players suffered food poisoning after taking their meals on Friday at the Games Village at Universiti Malaysia Pahang (UMP) including key players – Nordalila Ramlee and Zaimah Mohd Nasir who were recuperate at the Tengku Ampuan Afzan Hospital in Kuantan.

== Related events ==
=== Paralympiad Malaysia ===
Logo

Mascot

The 16th Paralympiad Malaysia was held in Pahang from 9 to 14 December.

District	Competition Venue	Sports
Kuantan	Wisma Belia Aquatic Centre	Swimming
Kuantan	Malaysia International Islam University	Goalball
Kuantan	Balok Petanque Court	Petanque
Kuantan	Kuantan Parade	Powerlifting, Bowling
Kuantan	Chong Ching Tanah Putih Primary School	Wheelchair Rugby, Wheelchair Basketball
Kuantan	Darul Makmur Stadium	Athletics
Kuantan	Polisas Kuantan	Archery
Kuantan	Indera Mahkota Youth Building Main Hall	Boccia
Kuantan	Camp PGA Bukit Galing, Semambu	Sitting Volleyball, Chess
Kuantan	Pahang Badminton Association Badminton Court	Badminton
Kuantan	Kuantan Futsal Stadium	Futsal
Kuantan	MAKSAK Hall	Table Tennis
Kuantan	Taman Gelora Tennis Court	Wheelchair tennis
Kuantan	SUKPA Lawn Bowl court	Lawn bowls

* Host nation (Pahang)

2012 Paralimpiad Malaysia
Rank	State	Gold	Silver	Bronze	Total
1	Sarawak	72	62	54	188
2	Johor	62	35	39	136
3	Malacca	28	26	19	73
4	Terengganu	28	17	20	65
5	Penang	25	26	21	72
6	Pahang*	20	14	16	50
7	Selangor	18	26	21	65
8	Sabah	18	15	15	48
9	Federal Territory	15	21	24	60
10	Negeri Sembilan	15	16	21	52
11	Kelantan	15	10	17	42
12	Kedah	11	15	7	33
13	Perlis	10	8	7	25
14	Perak	9	17	16	42
15	Labuan	3	4	11	18
Totals (15 entries)		349	312	308	969

Preceded by Malacca	Sukma Games; Kuala Lumpur–Pahang; XIV–XV Sukma Games (2011–2012)	Succeeded by Kuala Lumpur–Perlis
