= 2016 Sukma Games =

Multi-sport event in Sarawak, Malaysia

XVIII Sukma Games
- Host city: Sarawak
- Motto: Perpaduan dalam Kepelbagaian (Unity in Diversity)
- Teams: 15
- Athletes: 5670
- Events: 382 in 24 sports (28 disciplines)
- Opening: 23 July
- Closing: 31 July
- Opened by: Governor Abdul Taib Mahmud
- Closed by: Deputy Prime Minister Ahmad Zahid Hamidi
- Main venue: Sarawak Stadium
- Website: 2016 Sukma Games

The 2016 Sukma Games, officially known as the 18th Sukma Games, was a Malaysian multi-sport event held in Sarawak. This was Sarawak's second time to host the Sukma Games, having earlier done so in 1990.

The Games were held from 23 to 31 July 2016, although several events had commenced from 19 July 2016. Around 5670 athletes from 13 states, Federal Territory and Brunei participated at the Games which featured 382 events in 24 sports. The Games were opened by Abdul Taib Mahmud, the governor of Sarawak at the Sarawak Stadium.

The final medal tally was led by Selangor, followed by the hosts Sarawak and Terengganu. 6 national and 67 Games records were broken during this edition of Sukma Games. Malaccan sprinter Khairul Hafiz Jantan and Terengganuan archer Nur Aqilah Yusof were announced as best sportsman and best sportswoman of the games respectively.

== Host state ==
Sarawak as the host of the 2016 Sukma Games

Sarawak was chosen to host the games in 2013 during a Ministry of youth and sports meeting chaired by Khairy Jamaluddin. It had previously hosted the 1990 Sukma Games where it emerged as overall champion.

== Development and preparation ==
The Sarawak Sukma Games Organising Committee was formed to oversee the staging of the event.

=== Venues ===
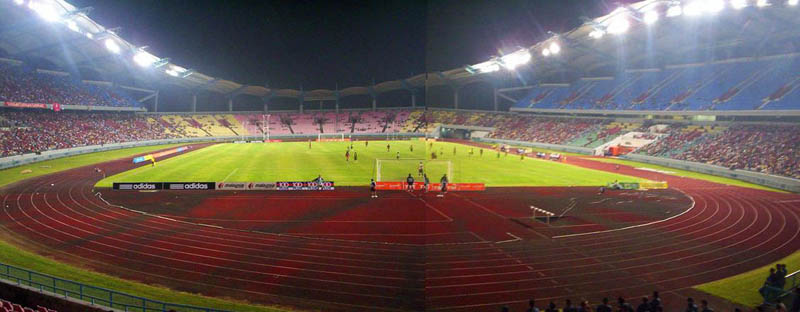
Sarawak Stadium, venue of the athletics and the opening and closing ceremonies for the 18th Sukma Games

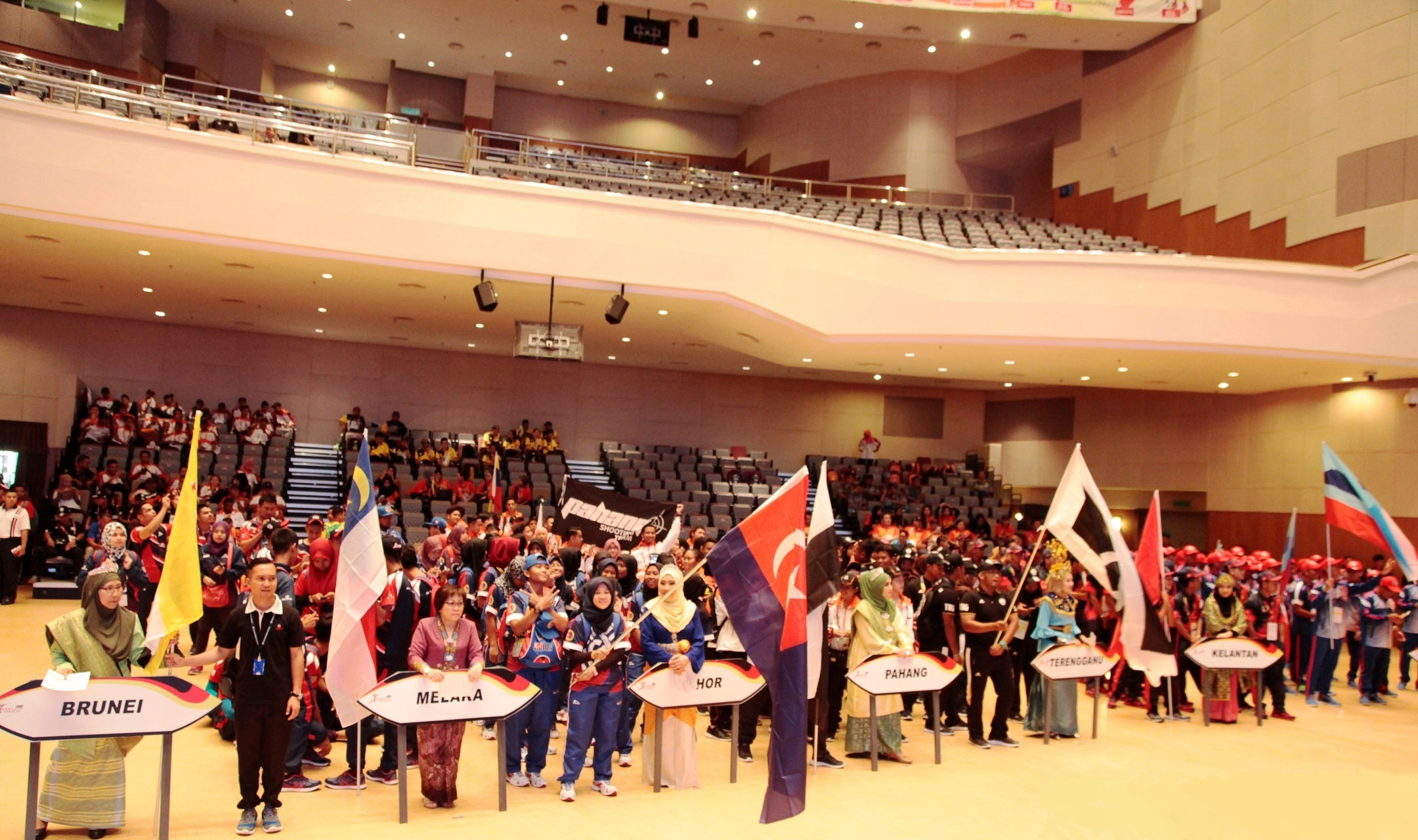
Opening ceremony of SUKMA Games Village at UNIMAS

The 2016 Sukma Games used a mix of new and existing venues. Most venues were existing public-sporting facilities, while others were newly constructed venues. Some retrofitting work were done in venues which are more than a decade old. They were reverted to public use after the games. Some had been used to host multi-disciplinary events such as the 1990 Sukma Games.

At the centrepiece of the activities was the upgraded Petra Jaya Sports Complex. Incorporating the 40,000-seat Sarawak Stadium, it hosts most of the events. A games village was not built, instead athletes and officials were housed in universities across Sarawak such as Universiti Malaysia Sarawak which was chosen to be the official games village. Besides being physically near to the competition venues, it was hoped that it will add vibe to the host cities and reduce post-games costs in converting a dedicated games village to other uses.

The 18th Sukma Games had 24 venues for the games: 17 in Kuching, 3 in Samarahan, 2 each in Miri and Sibu respectively.

Division	Competition Venue	Sports
Kuching	Petra Jaya Sports Complex
Kuching	Sarawak Stadium	Opening and closing ceremony, Athletics
Kuching	Sarawak State Stadium	Football
Kuching	Field D	Football
Kuching	Petra Jaya Unity Stadium	Taekwondo, Gymnastics (Artistic)
Kuching	Pandalela Rinong Aquatics Stadium	Aquatics
Kuching	Sarawak Lawn Bowls Arena	Lawn bowls
Kuching	Petra Jaya Hockey Stadium	Hockey (Men)
Kuching	Sarawak Petanque Centre	Petanque
Kuching	Sarawak Shooting Centre	Shooting
Kuching	Others
Kuching	Kuching South City Council Stadium	Gymnastics (Rhythmic), Boxing
Kuching	Paku High School Hockey Field	Hockey (Women)
Kuching	Bukit Siol Kuching	Cycling (BMX, Mountain biking)
Kuching	Pehin Sri Adenan Satem Highway (FAC Highway)	Cycling (Road)
Kuching	Sarawak Lawn Tennis Association	Tennis
Kuching	Chung Hua Primary School No. 3	Wushu
Kuching	Sarawak Squash Court	Squash
Kuching	Emart Megalanes Bowling Centre, Batu Kawa	Bowling
Kuching	Sarawak Golf Club	Golf
Samarahan	Universiti Malaysia Sarawak	Archery, Football
Samarahan	Kota Samarahan Indoor Stadium	Pencak silat
Samarahan	Universiti Teknologi MARA	Weightlifting
Miri	Miri City Stadium	Karate, Sepak takraw
Miri	Marina Bay Miri	Sailing
Sibu	Sibu Prudential Volleyball Association Stadium	Volleyball
Sibu	Sibu Indoor Stadium	Badminton

=== Volunteers ===
The organisers estimated that about 4,000 volunteers between the age of 18 and 60 are needed to successfully host the games.

=== Countdown ===
The countdown to the games began on 22 July 2015 at the Baitul Makmur in Petra Jaya, Kuching during the press conference of the games to mark the one year countdown to the games. A launch party was held on 20 October 2015 at the Meritz Hotel in Miri in conjunction with the 2013 and 2014 Sarawak state sports awards where the logo, theme and mascots were introduced. Begin December 2015, Pre-Games tournaments were held across Sarawak for Sukma Games sports events.

=== Baton relay ===
A relay of baton was held statewide, began with the town of Lawas on 13 February 2016, passed through several cities in Sarawak and ended in Sematan on 17 April 2016.

No.	City, Division	Date
1	Lawas, Limbang	13 February
2	Limbang, Limbang and Miri, Miri	14 February
3	Subis and Beluru, Miri	20 February
4	Marudi and Telang Usan, Miri	21 February
5	Mukah and Dalat, Mukah	27 February
6	Matu, Daro and Tanjung Manis, Mukah	28 February
7	Kapit and Bukit Mambong, Kapit	5 March
8	Song, Kapit	6 March
9	Belaga, Kapit and Bintulu and Sebauh, Bintulu	12 March
10	Tatau, Bintulu and Selangau, Sibu	13 March
11	Sibu and Kanowit, Sibu and Pakan and Julau, Sarikei	19 March
12	Sarikei and Meradong, Sarikei	26 March
13	Kabong and Saratok, Betong	27 March
14	Betong and Pusa, Betong	2 April
15	Simanggang and Lubok Antu, Sri Aman	3 April
16	Serian and Tebedu, Serian	9 April
17	Simunjan and Asajaya, Samarahan	10 April
18	Kota Samarahan, Samarahan and Kuching, Kuching	16 April
19	Bau, Lundu and Sematan, Kuching	17 April

=== Public transport ===
Shuttle bus services, Rapid KL Buses were provided throughout the games and were used to ferry athletes and officials to and from the airport, games venues and games village.

== Marketing ==
=== Motto ===
The motto of the 2016 Sukma Games is "Unity in diversity". It was chosen to represent the unity of the athletes from the 14 states of Malaysia and Brunei, technical officers, assisting staffs and volunteers of the games of different races and backgrounds.

=== Logo ===
'Satria' and 'Satrina', the official mascot.

The logo of the 2016 Sukma Games is an image of a hornbill, the state bird of Sarawak. The hornbill on the logo and colours of the flag of Sarawak, red, yellow and black, represents Sarawak as host of the Sukma Games while the element of the sun of the logo represents the participating athlete's speed and agility.

=== Mascot ===
The official mascots of the 2016 Sukma Games is a pair of hornbills named Satria (male) and Satrina (female) respectively, which were designed by Amir Hassan Mohd Shah. It is said that Sarawak is known by many as "Bumi Kenyalang" or the "Land of the Hornbills" with the hornbills regarded as the symbol of the state. The adoption of Hornbills as the games' mascot is to represent the state of Sarawak as the games' host state.

=== Official song ===
The official song of the games is "Berpadu Menyahut Cabaran" (Unite in Accepting Challenges).

=== Corporate sponsorship ===
- Rapid KL
- Konsortium Logistik Berhad
- Tenaga Nasional
- Celcom (now Celcom Digi)
- Malindo Air
- 100plus

== The games ==
=== Opening ceremony ===
The opening ceremony was held on Saturday, 23 July 2016, beginning at 20:30 MST (UTC+8) at the Sarawak Stadium. The ceremony began with Yang di-Pertua Negeri Abdul Taib Mahmud and his wife, Toh Puan Raghad Kurdi Taib entered the stadium in a buggy car and the playing of the national anthem of Malaysia and the state anthem of Sarawak. This was followed by a countdown performance, an opener performance combining light dance, laser projection technology and firework display with the theme beautiful Sarawak and Sarawak Sukma Games. Later, a parade of athletes led by the games volunteers was held, began with the invitational contingent, Brunei, followed by all the states of Malaysia with host Sarawak enters the stadium last. After sports minister Khairy Jamaluddin and the then Chief Minister Adenan Satem gave their respective speech, a baton relay by Sarawak famous athletes was held began with Ramli Ahmad of Pencak silat, Wong Tee Kui of athletics, Sapok Biki of boxing, Edmund Yeo of weightlifting, Mohamad Azlan Iskandar of squash, Daniel Bego of swimming, Bryan Nickson Lomas of diving, Assri Azri Marzuki of tennis, Watson Nyambek of athletics and Tania Bugo of swimming. After Abdul Taib Mahmud declared the games opened, Watson and Tania placed the baton on the pedestal to light up the cauldron. After the cauldron was lit, the games flag was raised by Royal Malaysian navy personnel, followed by Bon Yusuf performing the games' theme song, Berpadu Menyahut Cabaran accompanied by violinist, Nisa Addina Mohd Taufik. This was followed by pledge recitation and dance performance by Kuching students with the theme "Unity in Diversity". The ceremony ended with a musical firework performance for 7 minutes.

=== Closing ceremony ===
The closing ceremony was held on Sunday, 31 July 2016, beginning at 20:30 MST (UTC+8) at the Sarawak Stadium. The ceremony begins with volunteers leading the athletes enter the stadium began with the invitational contingent, Brunei, followed by all the states of Malaysia with host Sarawak enters the stadium last. This was followed by the arrival of guests including Ahmad Zahid Hamidi, Khairy Jamaluddin and Adenan Satem, the playing of the national anthem of Malaysia and the state anthem of Sarawak. After a series of performance and Khairy gave his speech, Ahmad Zahid Hamidi gave his speech and declared the games closed. Later, Khairul Hafiz Jantan of athletics from Malacca and Nur Aqilah of archery from Terengganu were announced as best sportsman and best sportswoman respectively. Selangor was also announced as the overall champion of the games, beating host Sarawak. After the games flag lowered by Royal Malaysian Navy personnel and the cauldron extinguished, the Sukma Games responsibility was handed over to Perak, host of the 2018 Sukma Games where Zambry Abdul Kadir received the games flag as its symbolisation. A Perak segment performance was later performed by Perak dancers. The ceremony concludes with a series of cultural dances and firework performance.

=== Participating states ===
An estimated total of 5670 athletes from 13 states, Federal Territory and Brunei competed at the 2016 Sukma Games.

- Johor (408 athletes)
- Kedah (358)
- Kelantan (220)
- Malacca (307)
- Negeri Sembilan (330)
- Pahang (412)
- Penang (380)
- Perak (498)
- Perlis (253)
- Sabah (431)
- Sarawak (544)
- Selangor (507)
- Terengganu (485)
- Federal Territory (478)
- Brunei (59)

=== Sports ===
The Sarawak Sukma Games Organising Committee had confirmed a total of 24 sports (with 28 disciplines) for the 2016 Sukma Games. The announcement took place after the sports were endorsed at the games countdown in Baitul Makmur, Petra Jaya.

- Aquatics
  - Diving (10)
  - Swimming (38)
- Archery (24)
- Athletics (45)
- Badminton (7)
- Bowling (11)
- Boxing (9)
- Cycling
  - BMX racing (2)
  - Mountain biking (4)
  - Road (14)
- Field hockey (2)
- Football (1)
- Golf (4)
- Gymnastics
  - Artistic (14)
  - Rhythmic (5)
- Karate (16)
- Lawn bowls (8)
- Pencak silat (26)
- Petanque (11)
- Sailing (12)
- Sepak takraw (6)
- Shooting (26)
- Squash (7)
- Taekwondo (19)
- Tennis (7)
- Volleyball (2)
- Weightlifting (32)
- Wushu (20)

=== Calendar ===
OC	Opening ceremony	●	Event competitions	1	Gold medal events	CC	Closing ceremony

July 2016		19th Tue	20th Wed	21st Thu	22nd Fri	23rd Sat	24th Sun	25th Mon	26th Tue	27th Wed	28th Thu	29th Fri	30th Sat	31st Sun	Events
Ceremonies						OC								CC	
Aquatics	Diving					2	3	2	2	1					10
Aquatics	Swimming					8	8	7	8	7					38
Archery							8	8	2	2	2	2			24
Athletics									6	14	12	13			45
Badminton			●	●	●	●	2	●	●	●	5				7
Bowling							2	2	1	●	2	2	2		11
Boxing						●	●	●	●	●	●	●	9		9
Cycling	Road cycling		2	2	2	2	2	2	2						14
Cycling	BMX										2				2
Cycling	Mountain biking											2	2		4
Field hockey			●	●	●	●	●	●	●	●		●	2		2
Football		●	●	●	●	●	●		●		●		1		1
Golf									●	●	4				4
Gymnastics	Artistic										2	2	10		14
Gymnastics	Rhythmic		1	4											5
Karate		5	5	6											16
Lawn bowls			●	●	●		●	4	●	●	●	●	4		8
Pencak silat								●	●	8	●	18			26
Petanque							●	2	2	●	4	●	3		11
Sailing								●	●	●	●	12			12
Sepak takraw						●	●	●	2	●	●	●	4		6
Shooting								4	6	6	6	4			26
Squash						●	●	4	●	●	3				7
Taekwondo		3	6	6	4										19
Tennis					●	●	●	2	●	●	●	2	3		7
Volleyball	Volleyball		●	●	●	●	●	●	●	●	●	2			2
Weightlifting					4		4	4	4	4	4	4	4		32
Wushu						6	8	6							20
Daily medal events		8	14	18	10	18	37	47	35	42	46	63	44	0	382
Cumulative total		8	22	40	50	68	105	152	187	229	275	338	382	382	382
July 2016		19th Tue	20th Wed	21st Thu	22nd Fri	23rd Sat	24th Sun	25th Mon	26th Tue	27th Wed	28th Thu	29th Fri	30th Sat	31st Sun	Total events

=== Medal table ===
* Host nation (Sarawak)

Rank	Team	Gold	Silver	Bronze	Total
1	Selangor	59	73	63	195
2	Sarawak*	57	43	59	159
3	Terengganu	47	42	44	133
4	Federal Territory	40	44	42	126
5	Pahang	30	25	21	76
6	Penang	26	12	29	67
7	Sabah	25	37	37	99
8	Johor	19	25	31	75
9	Negeri Sembilan	19	12	30	61
10	Malacca	18	11	28	57
11	Kedah	14	10	23	47
12	Perak	12	26	34	72
13	Kelantan	10	12	13	35
14	Perlis	9	7	15	31
15	Brunei (BRU)	0	1	3	4
Totals (15 entries)		385	380	472	1,237

== Broadcasting ==
Radio Televisyen Malaysia was responsible for live streaming of several events, opening and closing ceremony of the games.

== Malaysian Paralympiad ==
Logo that was launched on 14 May 2016.

6 to 10 August 2016.

Division	Competition Venue	Sports
Kuching	Petra Jaya Sports Complex
Kuching	Sarawak Stadium	Athletics
Kuching	Petra Jaya Unity Stadium	Opening and closing ceremony
Kuching	Pandalela Rinong Aquatics Stadium	Swimming
Kuching	Sarawak Lawn bowls Arena	Lawn bowls
Kuching	Others
Kuching	Emart Megalanes Bowling Centre, Batu Kawa	Bowling
Samarahan	Universiti Teknologi MARA	Powerlifting
Samarahan	Kota Samarahan Indoor Stadium	Table tennis
Samarahan	Universiti Malaysia Sarawak	Archery, Badminton, Chess
Samarahan	Institut Pendidikan Guru Kampus Tun Abdul Razak	Badminton

OC	Opening ceremony	●	Event competitions	1	Gold medal events	CC	Closing ceremony

August	6 Sat	7 Sun	8 Mon	9 Tue	10 Wed	Events
Ceremonies	OC				CC	
Archery		4	4	3		11
Athletics	7	35	26	30	29	127
Badminton	4	●	2	●	5	11
Bowling		18	13	8		39
Chess		●	8	●	8	16
Lawn bowls	●	3	●	●	7	10
Powerlifting		2	4	6		12
Swimming			19	27	29	75
Table tennis		7	9	5	4	25
Daily medal events	11	69	85	79	82	326
Cumulative total	11	80	165	244	326	326
August	6 Sat	7 Sun	8 Mon	9 Tue	10 Wed	Total events

* Host nation (Sarawak)

2016 Malaysian Paralympiad medal table
Rank	State	Gold	Silver	Bronze	Total
1	Sarawak*	84	63	73	220
2	Johor	35	25	15	75
3	Terengganu	30	24	19	73
4	Sabah	25	23	26	74
5	Penang	23	10	19	52
6	Perlis	22	6	8	36
7	Federal Territory	19	31	31	81
8	Kedah	16	19	13	48
9	Selangor	16	15	17	48
10	Kelantan	15	12	14	41
11	Malacca	14	17	13	44
12	Perak	12	17	15	44
13	Negeri Sembilan	8	13	7	28
14	Pahang	7	10	7	24
15	Labuan	0	2	3	5
Totals (15 entries)		326	287	280	893

== Concerns and controversies ==
=== The Politically Charged "#KitaLawan" Motto Controversy ===
Before the games began, the Selangor state government proposed using the motto "#KitaLawan" (We Fight) for its state contingent. This sparked significant controversy as the phrase was heavily associated with a prominent political opposition movement at the time. The Sultan of Selangor, Sultan Sharafuddin Idris Shah, expressed his strong displeasure, stating that sporting events must stay completely free of politics and racial elements. The state government subsequently dropped the slogan to avoid further friction.

=== The BMX Track Deficiencies ===
Cycling teams and athletes raised alarms over the newly constructed BMX track in Kuching, which allegedly cost around RM1 million. Competitors and coaches complained that the track did not meet proper standard specifications, citing design flaws that posed safety risks to the riders.

=== Scheduling and Attendance Lows ===
The National Sports Council (NSC) faced criticism because the 2016 Games were not scheduled during the national school holidays. This resulted in visibly lower spectator turnouts and thinner crowds at multiple venues, prompting discussions on how future editions should manage scheduling better to maintain public interest.

== See also ==
- 2024 Sukma Games

Preceded by Kuala Lumpur–Perlis	Sukma Games; Sarawak; XVIII Sukma Games (2016)	Succeeded by Perak
