= 2018 Sukma Games =

Multi-sport event in Perak, Malaysia

XIX Sukma Games
- Host city: Perak
- Motto: Wow! Kita Hebat! (Wow! We are Great!)
- Teams: 15
- Athletes: 7464
- Events: 427 in 29 sports (36 disciplines)
- Opening: 11 September
- Closing: 22 September
- Opened by: Nazrin Shah; Sultan of Perak
- Closed by: Wan Azizah; Deputy Prime Minister of Malaysia
- Athlete's Oath: Ahmad Khusyairi Abdul Razak
- Main venue: Perak Stadium
- Website: sukma2018.perak.gov.my

The 2018 Sukma Games, officially known as the 19th Sukma Games was a multi-sport event held in Perak from 11 to 22 September 2018. This was Perak's second time to host the Sukma Games, having done so earlier in 1994.

The Games were held from 11 to 22 September 2018, although several events had commenced from 8 September 2018. Around 7464 athletes from 13 states, Federal Territory and Brunei participated in the Games, which featured 427 events in 29 sports. The Games were opened by Nazrin Shah, the Sultan of Perak at the Perak Stadium.

The final medal tally was led by Terengganu, followed by host Federal Territory and Selangor. 5 national and 27 games records were broken during the games. Sabahan archer Eugenius Lo Foh Soon and Terengganuan sprinter Azreen Nabila Alias were announced as best sportsman and best sportswoman of the games respectively.

== Host city ==
On 15 May 2015, during the Sukma executive committee meeting chaired by Youth and Sports Minister Khairy Jamaluddin, the committee jointly awarded Perak and Johor the hosting rights of the 2018 and 2020 Sukma Games respectively.

== Development and Preparation ==
=== Venues ===
On 29 May 2016, the federal government allocated RM152 million to the Perak state government for organising the Games. This included RM 20 million that was spent on renovation and repair works for some old sporting facilities such as Perak Stadium, Velodrome Rakyat and Stadium Indera Mulia, and the rebuilding of Ipoh City Council Swimming Complex. The government also states that all 12 districts of Perak will host at least one sporting event.

District	Competition Venue	Sports
Kinta
Kinta	Ipoh City Council (MBI) Sports Complex	
Kinta	Perak Stadium	Athletics, Opening and closing ceremonies
Kinta	Tuanku Zara Aquatic Centre	Aquatics
Kinta	Amanjaya Badminton Arena	Badminton
Kinta	Indera Mulia Stadium	Gymnastics
Kinta	Azlan Shah Stadium	Hockey
Kinta	Squash Stadium	Squash
Kinta	Lawn bowls complex	Lawn bowls
Kinta	Rugby mini stadium	Rugby sevens
Kinta	Velodrome Rakyat	Cycling (Track)
Kinta	Others	
Kinta	Kolej Sains Kesihatan Bersekutu	Sepak takraw
Kinta	Ampang superbowl	Bowling
Kinta	Amanjaya shooting complex, Chepor	Shooting
Kinta	Poi Lam High School	Basketball
Kinta	Padang Ipoh	Cricket
Kinta	Renjer Kem Syed Putra Field	Cricket
Kinta	Royal Perak Golf Club	Golf
Larut, Matang and Selama
Larut, Matang and Selama	Taiping Bike Park	Cycling (Mountain bike)
Larut, Matang and Selama	Kamunting Lake Garden	Cycling (BMX)
Larut, Matang and Selama	Square Arena, Batu Kurau	Cycling (Road)
Larut, Matang and Selama	Taiping Lake Garden	Cycling (Criterium)
Larut, Matang and Selama	Advance Technology Training Centre Taiping	Netball
Manjung
Manjung	Manjung Municipal Council Stadium	Football
Manjung	Naval Base Stadium	Football
Manjung	Royal Navy Base	Sailing
Manjung	Manjung Indoor Sports Arena	Futsal
Kuala Kangsar	Perak Jubilee Hall	Pencak silat
Kuala Kangsar	Petanque Court	Petanque
Kampar	Perak Matriculation College	Wushu
Kampar	Sekolah Berasrama Penuh Integrasi Gopeng	Wushu
Kerian	SMJK Kerian	Judo
Kerian	Kerian District Council Field	Football
Muallim	Sultan Idris Education University	Handball, Football
Muallim	Sultan Azlan Shah Polytechnic	Karate
Batang Padang	Merdeka Hall Tapah District Council	Weightlifting
Bagan Datuk	Dato Loppe Hashim Hall	Boxing
Hilir Perak	San Min High School, Teluk Intan	Taekwondo
Hulu Perak	Gerik District Council Multi-purpose Hall	Muay
Perak Tengah	Universiti Teknologi Petronas	Archery

=== Volunteers ===
The organisers estimated that around 3000 volunteers are needed to successfully host the games.

=== Sponsors ===
Platinum

- Tenaga Nasional
- Telekom Malaysia
- Al-Ikhsan Sports

Gold

- Tan Chong Motor

Silver

- Sanyu
- Empayar Indera
- Molten Corporation
- Ashaway
- Rizzs
- Petronas

Silver (Continue)

- KL Teh land Development
- Milo
- 100 Plus

Bronze

- Boost
- Domino's Pizza
- Palace Vacation Club
- Oratis Rx
- G.B.Kuari
- 7-Eleven

=== Baton relay ===
A relay of baton (which resembles a torch) was held statewide, began and ended at the host city on 2 and 11 September respectively.

== Marketing ==
"Chor", the official mascot of the games.

=== Motto ===
The official motto of the games is "Wow! Kita Hebat!" (Wow! We are great!). Wow is the acronym for World of Wonders, a recognition given by Lonely Planet to Perak during the Visit Perak 2017 tourism campaign.

=== Logo ===
The official logo of the 2018 Sukma Games is an image that combines the elements of human and water wave. The human element symbolises the fighting spirit of the athletes at the highest level to achieve success and their positivity, while the water wave element represents the Perak River as the second longest river in Peninsular Malaysia that is the source of the basic needs for all Perak citizens. It was launched on 21 January 2018 at the Bulatan Amanjaya in Ipoh alongside the motto, mascot and the theme song.

=== Mascot ===
The official mascot of the 2018 Sukma Games is a Seladang or a Malayan Gaur named "Chor". In Perak, Chor is a name given to anyone in the local community who is the eldest in the family in the Perak Malay dialect. The mascot is designed to wear white sports attire, with its cheeks in yellow, both are which colours of the Perak state flag. It was chosen to portray physical and mental strength and burning spirit of overcoming challenges in sports.

=== Theme song ===
The theme song of the 2018 Sukma Games is “Wow! Kita The Greatest!” (Wow! We are the greatest!). It was composed and sung by Renowned composer and award-winning singer Datuk Wah Idris.

== The games ==
=== Opening ceremony ===
The opening ceremony was held on 11 September 2018 at the Perak Stadium at 8:00 pm.

The proceedings:

1. Arrival of Sultan of Perak, Nazzrin Shah and dignitaries.
2. National anthem and state anthem of Perak.
3. Prayer recitation.
4. Parade of states. Sarawak as host of last edition of Sukma entered stadium first, followed by other states by alphabetical order in Malay language. Johor as host of next edition of Sukma entered the stadium ahead of guest team from Brunei. As per tradition, Perak as host state entered the stadium last.
5. Countdown projection.
6. Dato Wah Idris and Ikhwan performed the games' theme song, "Wow, Kita the greatest".
7. Introductory performance: Indera Sakti.
8. Speech by sports minister Syed Saddiq, Perak state chief minister Ahmad Azumu.
9. Sultan of Perak Nazzrin Shah declared the games opened.
10. Final leg baton relay followed by Lighting of the cauldron. The cauldron resembles the keris, a Malay dagger which is the symbol of the king's power.
11. Raising of the Sukma Games flag by Royal Malaysian Navy personnel.
12. Ahmad Khusyairi Abdul Razak, national shooter take the Athletes' oath.
13. Cultural performance with 3 segments: Pahlawan Dabus (Dabus warrior), Perak Wow, Perak Gemilang (Glorious Perak), drumline and war cry performance. Intel drone and firework performance.

=== Closing ceremony ===
The closing ceremony was held on 22 September 2018 at the Perak Stadium at 8:00 pm.

Events:

1. Deputy Prime Minister Wan Azizah declared the games closed.
2. Eugenius Lo Fah Soon, Sabah archer awarded best sportsman title, Azreen Nabila Alias, Terengganu sprinter awarded best sportswoman title, Terengganu crowned as overall champion.
3. Cauldron extinguished, games hosting rights handed over to Johor, host of the 2020 Sukma Games. Followed by cultural performance of Johor.

=== Participating states ===
- Johor (495)
- Kedah (464)
- Kelantan (288)
- Malacca (376)
- Negeri Sembilan (411)
- Pahang (440)
- Penang (483)
- Perak (host) (587)
- Perlis (280)
- Sabah (416)
- Sarawak (553)
- Selangor (543)
- Terengganu (542)
- Federal Territories (532)
- Brunei (34)

=== Sports ===
On 12 December 2017, sports minister Khairy Jamaluddin announced that weightlifting, sepaktakraw and taekwondo have been dropped from the list of 19 core sports as well as the games' sports list due to decline in performances, doping issues as well as power struggles within the associations, leaves only 16 core sports for the 2018 edition. This decision however had drawn dissatisfaction from several sports council across the country including Sarawak and the Federal Territory. On 8 February 2018 after a discussion with the sports associations involved in the issue, Ahmad Shapawi announced during an organising committee meeting that weightlifting, sepaktakraw and taekwondo were reinstated as the games events but only as elective sports. At the same time, a total of 29 sports (with 36 disciplines) were confirmed as part of the games programme.

==== Initial cancellation and reinstatement of Track cycling events ====
On 5 June 2018, Perak’s Youth, Sports, and Human Capital Development Committee Chairman, Howard Lee Chuan How, initially announced that the six track cycling events (which accounted for 12 gold medals) would be dropped from the 19th Sukma Games.

The primary reasons cited were:

- Severe Safety Hazards: Following a site inspection, the track was described as resembling a "post-apocalyptic abandoned site". Despite a recent RM11 million refurbishment project funded by the Ministry of Youth and Sports, sections of the timber track were found to be rotting, moss-covered, warped, and splintered, presenting a catastrophic injury risk to the cyclists.
- Lack of Accreditation: The track lacked official certification from the International Cycling Union (Union Cycliste Internationale, UCI), without which the events could not officially proceed.

The sudden cancellation announcement caught sports bodies off guard and drew heavy criticism from state cycling associations, coaches, and athletes who had spent years training and buying new gear.

Following an emergency meeting between the Sports Ministry, the National Sports Council (NSC), and the Malaysian National Cycling Federation (MNCF), a compromise was reached. The cancellation order was modified to a conditional suspension. The state government stood firm that the events would remain cancelled unless the contractors fixed the flaws and the venue successfully obtained official UCI accreditation before a strict deadline in the first week of August 2018. The contractors, collaborating closely with the MNCF, accelerated the necessary structural adjustments required by the world governing body.

On 3 August 2018, UCI Track Manager Gilles Peruzzi conducted a comprehensive assessment of the venue. The track cleared all safety and technical parameters, leading the UCI to officially issue its Certificate of Homologation. MNCF Vice-President Datuk Amarjit Singh Gill personally retrieved the certification from the UCI Headquarters in Aigle, Switzerland. On 9 August 2018, the Perak state government confirmed that the track cycling events were officially reinstated into the Sukma schedule, just in time for the games in September.

- Aquatics
  - Diving (10)
  - Swimming (38)
- Archery (24)
- Athletics (45)
- Badminton (7)
- Basketball
  - 3×3 basketball (2)
  - Basketball (2)
- Bowling (11)
- Boxing (9)
- Cricket (1)
- Cycling
  - BMX racing (2)
  - Mountain bike (4)
  - Road (6)
  - Track (12)
- Field hockey (2)
- Football
  - Football (1)
  - Futsal (2)
- Golf (4)
- Gymnastics
  - Artistic (14)
  - Rhythmic (5)
- Handball (2)
- Judo (15)
- Karate (18)
- Lawn bowls (9)
- Muay (15)
- Netball (1)
- Pencak silat (26)
- Petanque (11)
- Rugby sevens (2)
- Sailing (13)
- Sepak takraw (8)
- Shooting (26)
- Squash (4)
- Taekwondo (19)
- Weightlifting (32)
- Wushu (23)

=== Calendar ===
OC	Opening ceremony	●	Event competitions	1	Gold medal events	CC	Closing ceremony

September 2018		8th Sat	9th Sun	10th Mon	11th Tue	12th Wed	13th Thu	14th Fri	15th Sat	16th Sun	17th Mon	18th Tue	19th Wed	20th Thu	21st Fri	22nd Sat	Events
Ceremonies					OC											CC	
Aquatics	Diving										2	3	2	2	1		10
Aquatics	Swimming										8	8	7	8	7		38
Archery										8	8	2	2	2	2		24
Athletics											7	11	13	14			45
Badminton			●	●	●	●	●	2	●	●	●	5					7
Basketball	Basketball								●	●	●	●	●	●	2		2
Basketball	3x3 Basketball													●	2		2
Bowling								2	2	1	●	2	●	2	2		11
Boxing									●	●	●	●	●		9		9
Cricket					●	●	●	●	●	●	●	●	●	●	1		1
Cycling	Road cycling					2	1	1	2								6
Cycling	Track cycling													●	4	8	12
Cycling	BMX										2						2
Cycling	Mountain biking											2	2				4
Field hockey							●	●	●	●	●	●	●	●	2		2
Football	Football	●	●	●	●	●	●		●		●		1				1
Football	Futsal		●	●		●	●	●	●		●	●	2				2
Golf									●	●	4						4
Gymnastics	Artistic										2	2	10				14
Gymnastics	Rhythmic				●	1	4										5
Handball									●	●	●	●	●	2			2
Judo						7	6	2									15
Karate									6	6	6						18
Lawn bowls							●	●	●	4	●	●	●	●	5		9
Muay Thai									●	●	●	●	●	15			15
Netball										●	●	●	●	●	●	1	1
Pencak silat								●	●	2	2	2	2	8	10		26
Petanque							2	●	3	●	4	●	2				11
Rugby sevens									●	2							2
Sailing									●	●	●	●	●	13			13
Sepak takraw								●	●	2	●	●	4	●	2		8
Shooting									4	6	6	6	4				26
Squash										●	●	2	●	●	●	2	4
Taekwondo											3	6	6	4			19
Weightlifting								4	4	4	4	4	4	4	4		32
Wushu					5	7	11										23
Daily medal events		0	0	0	5	17	25	11	22	35	58	55	61	74	53	11	427
Cumulative Total		0	0	0	5	22	47	58	80	115	173	228	289	363	416	427	427
September 2018		8th Sat	9th Sun	10th Mon	11th Tue	12th Wed	13th Thu	14th Fri	15th Sat	16th Sun	17th Mon	18th Tue	19th Wed	20th Thu	21st Fri	22nd Sat	Events

=== Medal table ===
- Gold medal tie in Artistic Gymnastics Women's Individual All-around.

* Host nation ( Perak)

2018 Sukma Games medal table
Rank	State	Gold	Silver	Bronze	Total
1	Terengganu	56	51	53	160
2	Federal Territory	52	38	49	139
3	Selangor	47	68	67	182
4	Sarawak	42	36	60	138
5	Perak*	37	50	56	143
6	Sabah	35	28	46	109
7	Pahang	33	20	30	83
8	Penang	32	30	31	93
9	Johor	29	34	37	100
10	Kedah	19	20	29	68
11	Malacca	18	18	18	54
12	Negeri Sembilan	13	18	43	74
13	Perlis	12	7	13	32
14	Kelantan	6	7	13	26
15	Brunei	0	1	3	4
Totals (15 entries)		431	426	548	1,405

== 2018 Sopma Games ==
The deaf national games known as the 2018 Sopma Games (20th Sopma Games) was held from 15 to 20 October 2018. The opening ceremony was held on 15 October 2018 at 7 pm, while the closing ceremony was held on 20 October 2018 at 7 pm. 551 athletes from 13 states and the federal territories participated at the games. 42 events were featured in 5 sports competed.

=== Sopma Venues ===
The following venues were used for the 2018 Sopma Games.

District	Competition Venue	Sports
Kinta	Sultan Azlan Shah Ministry of health training institute	Opening and closing ceremony
Kinta	Perak Stadium	Athletics
Kinta	Badminton Academy	Badminton
Kinta	Ampang Superbowl	Bowling
Kinta	Padang Ipoh	Football
Kinta	Prosport Futsal Arena	Futsal

=== Sopma Participating states ===
- Johor
- Kedah
- Kelantan
- Malacca
- Negeri Sembilan
- Pahang
- Penang
- Perak
- Perlis
- Sabah
- Sarawak
- Selangor
- Terengganu
- Federal Territories

=== Sopma Sports ===
- Athletics (24)
- Badminton (5)
- Bowling (10)
- Football (1)
- Futsal (2)

=== Sopma Calendar ===
OC	Opening ceremony	●	Event competitions	1	Gold medal events	CC	Closing ceremony

October	15 Mon	16 Tue	17 Wed	18 Thu	19 Fri	20 Sat	Events
Ceremonies	OC					CC	
Athletics			7	11	6		24
Badminton		●	●	●	●	5	5
Bowling		2	2	2	2	2	10
Football	●	●	●	●	●	1	1
Futsal			●	1	1		2
Daily medal events		2	9	14	9	8	42
Cumulative total		2	11	25	34	42	42
October	15 Mon	16 Tue	17 Wed	18 Thu	19 Fri	20 Sat	Events

=== Sopma Medal table ===
* Host nation (Perak)

2018 Sopma Games medal table
Rank	State	Gold	Silver	Bronze	Total
1	Federal Territory (WPE)	7	11	5	23
2	Sabah (SBH)	6	7	8	21
3	Terengganu (TRG)	5	3	1	9
4	Johor (JHR)	5	1	5	11
5	Penang (PNG)	4	7	6	17
6	Sarawak (SWK)	4	5	2	11
7	Kedah (KDH)	3	2	5	10
8	Perak (PRK)*	3	2	2	7
9	Kelantan (KEL)	3	1	1	5
10	Selangor (SGR)	2	2	8	12
11	Malacca (MLK)	0	1	2	3
12	Negeri Sembilan (NSE)	0	0	1	1
12	Perlis (PER)	0	0	1	1
14	Pahang (PHG)	0	0	0	0
Totals (14 entries)		42	42	47	131

== 2018 Para Sukma Games ==
The disabled national games known as the 2018 Para Sukma Games (19th Para Sukma Games) was held from 23 to 28 November 2018.

=== Para Venues ===
District	Competition Venue	Sports
Kinta
Kinta	Ipoh City Council (MBI) Sports Complex
Kinta	Perak Stadium	Athletics
Kinta	Tuanku Zara Aquatic Centre	Swimming
Kinta	Amanjaya Badminton Arena	Badminton
Kinta	Indera Mulia Stadium	Opening and closing ceremonies, Table tennis
Kinta	Rugby mini stadium	Archery
Kinta	Lawn bowls complex	Lawn bowls
Kinta	Others
Kinta	State Youth and Sports Department	Boccia, Chess
Kinta	State sports council	Powerlifting
Kinta	Ampang superbowl	Bowling

=== Para Participating states ===
- Johor
- Kedah
- Kelantan
- Malacca
- Negeri Sembilan
- Pahang
- Penang
- Perak
- Perlis
- Sabah
- Sarawak
- Selangor
- Terengganu
- Kuala Lumpur
- Labuan

=== Para Sports ===
- Archery (13)
- Athletics (134)
- Badminton (11)
- Boccia (7)
- Bowling (25)
- Chess (22)
- Lawn bowls (12)
- Powerlifting (13)
- Swimming (48)
- Table tennis (23)

=== Para Medal table ===
* Host nation (Perak)

2018 Para Sukma Games medal table
Rank	State	Gold	Silver	Bronze	Total
1	Sarawak (SWK)	61	62	41	164
2	Sabah (SBH)	36	28	30	94
3	Perak (PRK)*	29	33	22	84
4	Johor (JHR)	29	32	34	95
5	Terengganu (TRG)	28	16	23	67
6	Kelantan (KEL)	20	11	18	49
7	Kuala Lumpur (KUL)	19	25	21	65
8	Selangor (SGR)	17	17	27	61
9	Kedah (KDH)	16	16	26	58
10	Perlis (PER)	13	16	5	34
11	Penang (PNG)	13	13	14	40
12	Negeri Sembilan (NSE)	11	15	16	42
13	Pahang (PHG)	9	6	7	22
14	Malacca (MLK)	6	10	15	31
15	Labuan (LBN)	1	2	1	4
Totals (15 entries)		308	302	300	910

== Concerns and controversies ==
=== Before the Games ===
==== Promotional Video Plagiarism Debacle ====
A major public embarrassment occurred just weeks before the tournament when the Perak government had to issue an open apology for a promotional teaser video. The 19-second viral clip was discovered to have blatantly plagiarised and copied visual concepts from a well-known Taiwanese production titled "Taipei in Motion 2017" made for the 2017 Summer Universiade. The state's sports committee executive, Howard Lee Chuan How, admitted that improper vetting led to the blunder and clarified it was only a placeholder teaser.

==== Pre-Games Weightlifting Doping ====
Despite the organising secretariat partnering with the Malaysian Anti-Doping Agency (ADAMAS) to guarantee a clean event, the weightlifting sport was rocked just days before the opening ceremony. Pre-tournament screening of 165 lifters revealed that one weightlifter tested positive for banned substances. The unidentified athlete was immediately banned from competing and faced strict internal disciplinary action.

=== During the Games ===
==== Athletic and Officiating Dramas ====
On-field disputes caused heavy friction, particularly in the athletics track events:

Men's 10,000m Race Walk: The initial winner, R. Premkumaar of Negeri Sembilan, was dramatically disqualified after a post-race protest. A jury of seven officials ruled that Premkumaar had intentionally elbowed Perak's Mior Muhammad Amerul Mohd Sahak in the final 100-meter stretch. The gold medal was subsequently handed over to the Perak athlete.

Women's 5,000m Race Walk: The event was marred when Kelantan's walk racer, Nurul Alyahaziqah Kamarazaman, was controversially disqualified by technical delegates, triggering complaints from her state's contingent.

==== Media Reports of Subpar Accommodation ====
Local newspapers and social media circles widely circulated photos alleging that the athletes' village at the Industrial Training Institute (ILP) featured dilapidated lockers, broken bathrooms, and old mattresses thrown on floors, causing mosquito-breeding hazards. However, state officials quickly denied the severity of the reports, claiming the images were taken out of context by athletes simply pulling mattresses to the floor to relax.

==== Road cycling accident ====
The 2018 Sukma men's 160-kilometer road race on 13 September 2018 ended in controversy due to a high-profile crash near the finish line, involving top riders heading into the final sprint.

The incident: As the leading pack sprinted toward the finish line, a severe collision occurred among the top riders just meters from the end of the 160km race. Several cyclists crashed heavily onto the tarmac.

The outcome: Despite the crash disrupting the field and causing massive controversy among the state cycling contingents, Johor cyclist Mohamad Saari Amri Abd Rasim managed to navigate the chaos to clinch the gold medal, ending Johor's 14-year gold medal drought in the event.

=== After the Games ===
==== Post-Game Doping Reviews ====
Four Doping Test failures emerged following post-Game Reviews involving three weightlifters, including two from Terengganu and one from Pahang, all three tested positive for methylhexaneamine and dimethylbutlamine; and one under-21 female judo medalist from Perak, tested positive for the banned glucocorticoid triamcinolone acetonide.

==== 2018 Sukma Games Drone Show Dispute ====
On 8 April 2026, Ipoh High Court ordered the Perak state government, the state financial officer, and former exco Howard Lee Chuan How to pay over RM2 million or US$400,000 plus RM400,000 in special damages to event management company Bsynclive Sdn Bhd. Bsynclive had arranged a drone light show (utilising Intel drones) after received letter of acceptance on 13 July 2018 and signed an agreement on 9 August to be the 2018 Sukma Games opening and closing ceremonies manager. Subsequently, the state government was found liable after failing to honour commitments, having guaranteed corporate sponsorships (including from Pestech Energy) that fell through or left the performance uncompensated despite the state benefiting from the service.

Preceded by Sarawak	Sukma Games; Perak; XIX Sukma Games (2018)	Succeeded by Kuala Lumpur
