= Tuanku Abdul Rahman Stadium =

Stadium in Paroi, Seremban, Malaysia

Tuanku Abdul Rahman Stadium Stadium Tuanku Abdul Rahman
- Paroi Stadium; STAR of Paroi
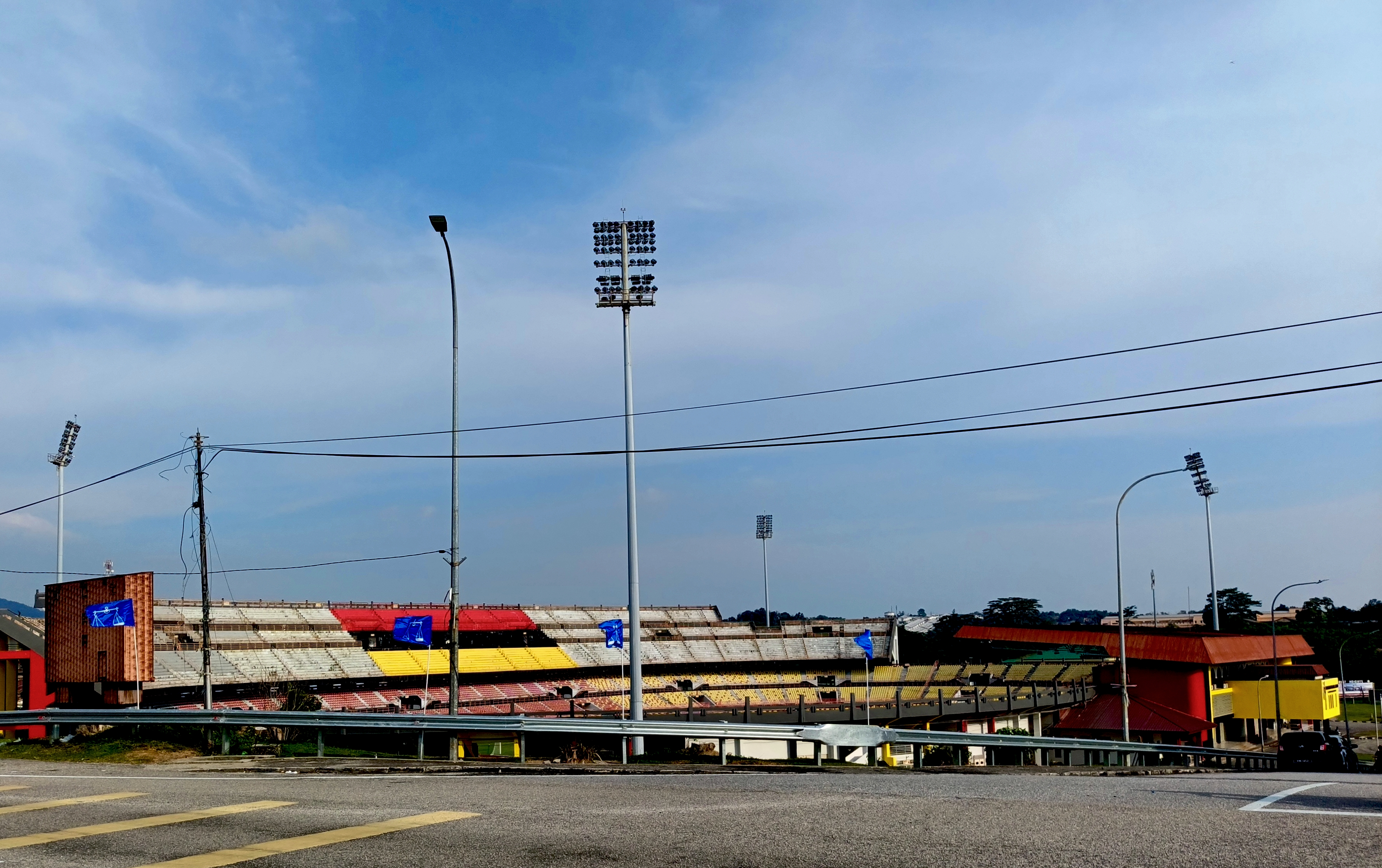
- Northwestern aspect of the stadium
- Interactive map of Tuanku Abdul Rahman Stadium; Stadium Tuanku Abdul Rahman
- Location: Taman Paroi Jaya, Paroi, 70400 Seremban, Negeri Sembilan, Malaysia
- Coordinates: 2.7259°N 101.9831°E
- Owner: Negeri Sembilan State Government
- Capacity: 30.412
- Surface: Grass pitch Track
- Record attendance: 43,500 (Negeri Sembilan vs T-Team), 2011 Malaysian Cup semi-final second leg
- Field size: 120m x 70m

Construction
- Opened: 22 April 1992; 34 years ago
- Renovated: 2004, 2024
- Expanded: 2004
- Reopened: May 2024; 2 years ago
- Cost: RM15 million

Tenants
- Negeri Sembilan (1992–present); KSR SAINS (2018–2023); Bunga Raya F.C. (selected matches); Syria national football team (2018)

The Tuanku Abdul Rahman Stadium (STAR, Malay: Stadium Tuanku Abdul Rahman), also known by its informal name Stadium Paroi or Paroi Stadium and sobriquet The STAR of Paroi, is a multi-purpose stadium in Paroi, Seremban, Negeri Sembilan, Malaysia. It is currently used mostly for football matches. Inaugurated on 23 April 1992, the stadium initially held a capacity of 20,000 people. The capacity has been upgraded to 45,000 people for the 2004 Sukma Games, effectively making it the largest stadium in Peninsular Malaysia's southern region, and third largest nationwide. It is currently home to the Malaysia Super League club Negeri Sembilan FC. The stadium is named in honour of Tuanku Abdul Rahman ibni Almarhum Tuanku Muhammad, the eighth Yang di-Pertuan Besar of Negeri Sembilan and the first Yang di-Pertuan Agong of Malaysia.

During the third round of the 2018 FIFA World Cup qualification, the Syria national football team played two of its home matches at the stadium due to the Syrian Civil War.

== History ==
=== Background ===
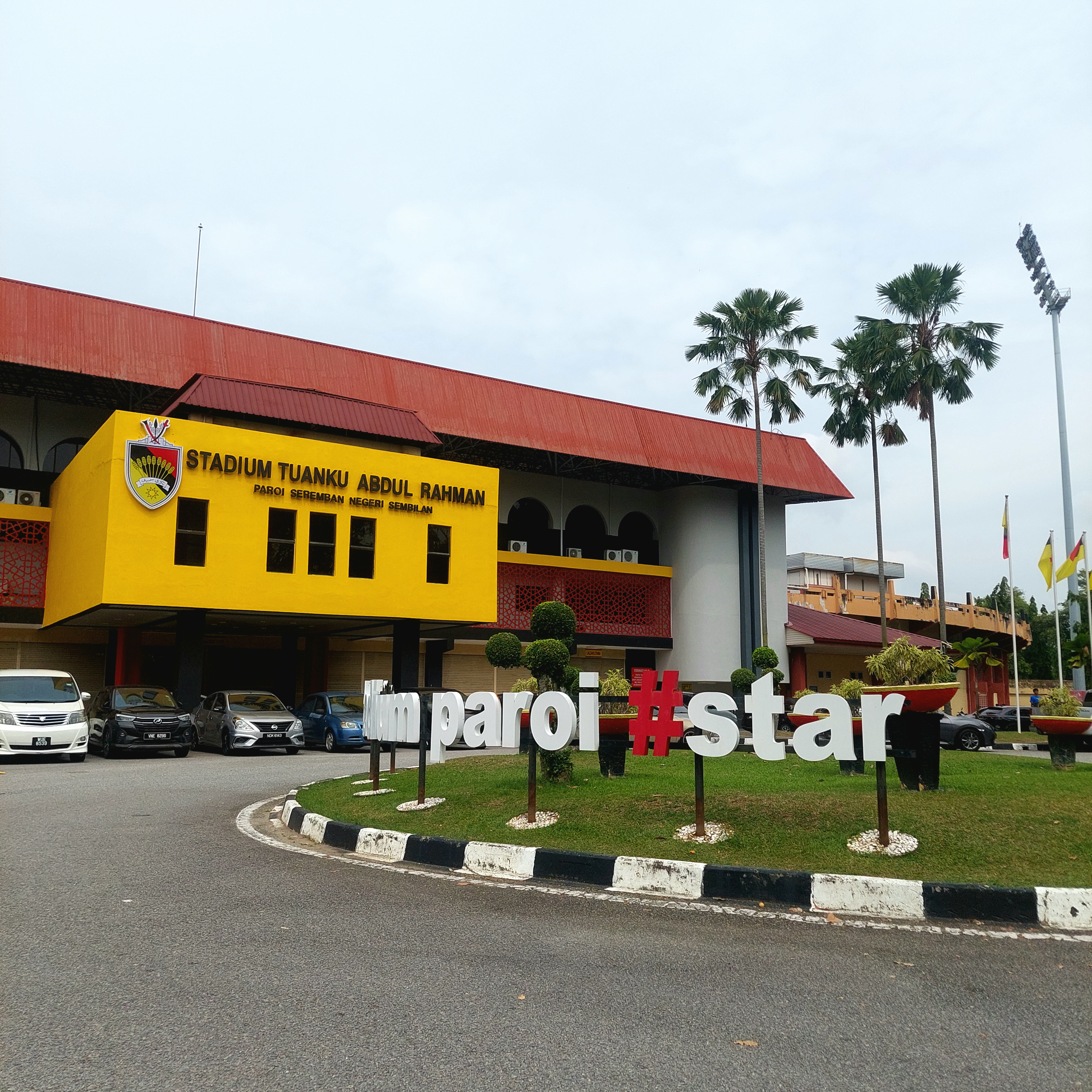
Main entrance of the stadium, which also includes its grandstand

Before 1992, Negeri Sembilan FA played football matches in Seremban Municipal Stadium. Following the appointment of the new Menteri Besar, Mohd Isa Abdul Samad on 29 April 1982, he decided to build a new sports complex in Paroi as part of a plan to modernize Negeri Sembilan.

The old site of the stadium was a military camp and an airstrip for the 2 Flight Army Air Corp. The military camp was built during the height of the Malayan Emergency to provide air cover for the jungle operation. The military camp and airstrip were demolished in the 1990s to build the new state stadium for Negeri Sembilan.

=== Opening and later refurbishments ===
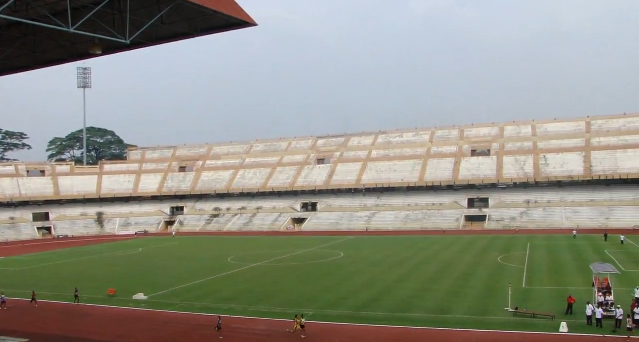
The eastern stand of the stadium, upgraded in 2004. The upper seats in the centre of the stand were painted with the state flag's colours in 2013.

The stadium finally opened on 11 April 1992, with a final match of the 1992 Piala Emas Raja-Raja between the Negeri Sembilan Malays Football Association and Terengganu Malays Football Association, which the home side won 2–1 with Lim Teong Kim and Yeo Swee Hock putting their names on the scoresheet.

The stadium officially opened on 23 April 1992, when Tuanku Ja’afar ibni Almarhum Tuanku Abdul Rahman declared it open by himself during the opening day of the Negeri Sembilan Athletics School Championship at 3 p.m. The cost of the new multi-purpose stadium was around RM15 million.

In 2004, Negeri Sembilan became the host of the 2004 Sukma Games. Major renovation and construction took place in this area, especially the stadium. The capacity of the stadium had been upgraded to 45,000 people for this event.

The stadium has been used for athletic and football events. On 29 May 2004, the opening ceremony took place. The Negeri Sembilan football squad has lived up to their favourites in the Sukma by winning the men's football gold medal, defeating Johore 1–0 in the final match on 5 June 2004. The closing ceremony happened on 6 June 2004.

== Facilities ==
The Paroi Stadium currently has a capacity of around 45,000. Most of the seats in the stadium are yellow and red plastic chairs, a significant upgrade from the reinforced concrete stadium seating for most of the stands and the orange chairs at the grandstand. The upper level of the stadium's eastern stand retains the traditional concrete seating.

Outside the stadium, there are many food stalls and hawkers, such as Popia Kuala Kangsar, Mee Kari Stadium, Selera Pinggiran, and Dilz Chicken.

There are many parking lots at the stadium, which are usually used for the farmer's market on Sunday morning and the Ramadan bazaar.

== International fixtures ==
Date	Competition	Team	Score	Team
3 June 2006	2006 Causeway Challenge	Malaysia	0–0 (a.e.t.) (7–8 pen.)	Singapore
23 March 2016	International Friendly	Malaysia	4–1	Philippines
27 March 2016	International Friendly	Malaysia	1–1	Nepal
21 August 2016	International Friendly	Iraq	1–1	North Korea
6 September 2016	2018 FIFA World Cup qualification	Syria	0–0	South Korea
9 November 2016	International Friendly	Syria	2–0	Singapore
15 November 2016	2018 FIFA World Cup qualification	Syria	0–0	Iran
5 November 2019	International Friendly	Malaysia	2–1	Maldives

== Gallery ==
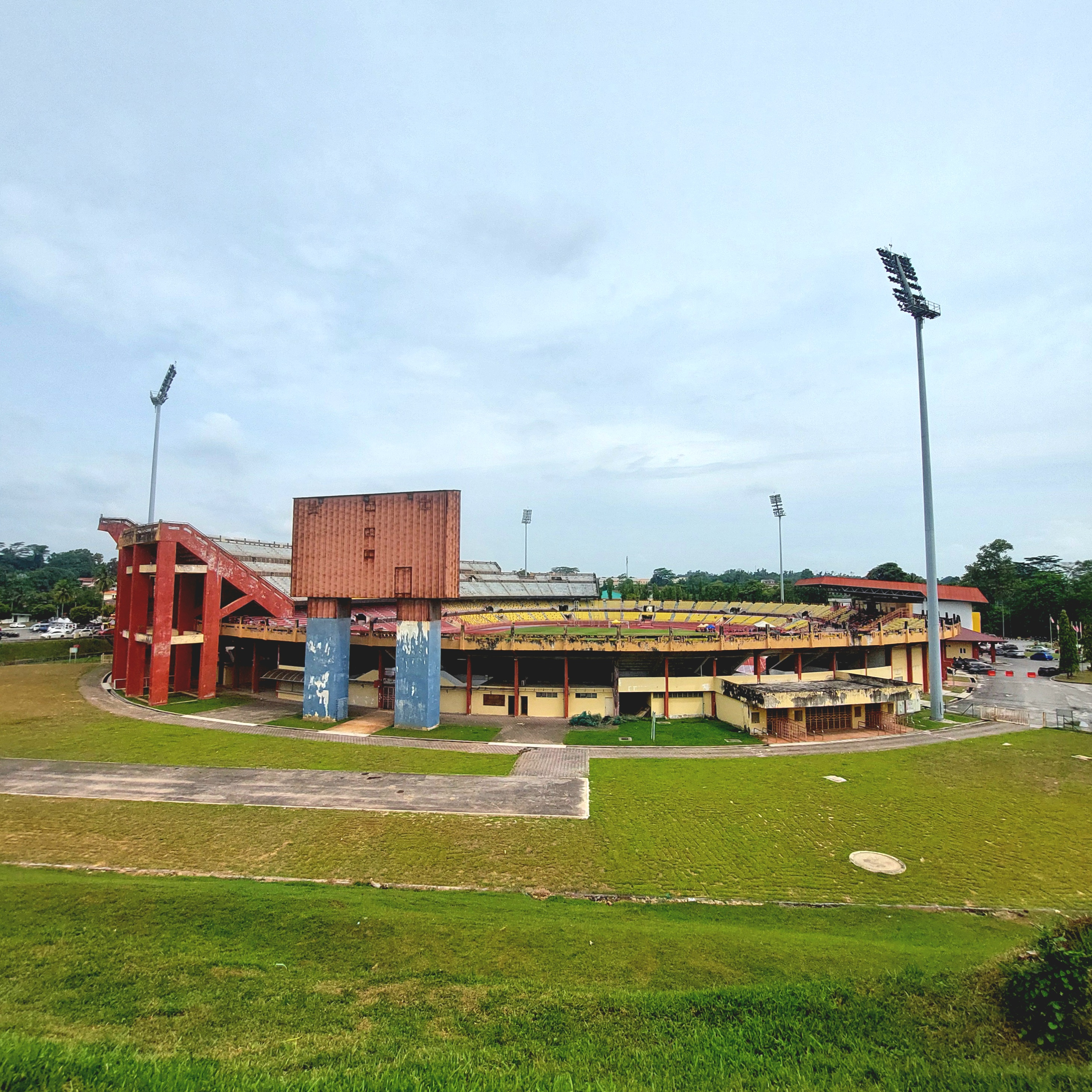
The Paroi Stadium in 2025, with old red-and-yellow exterior

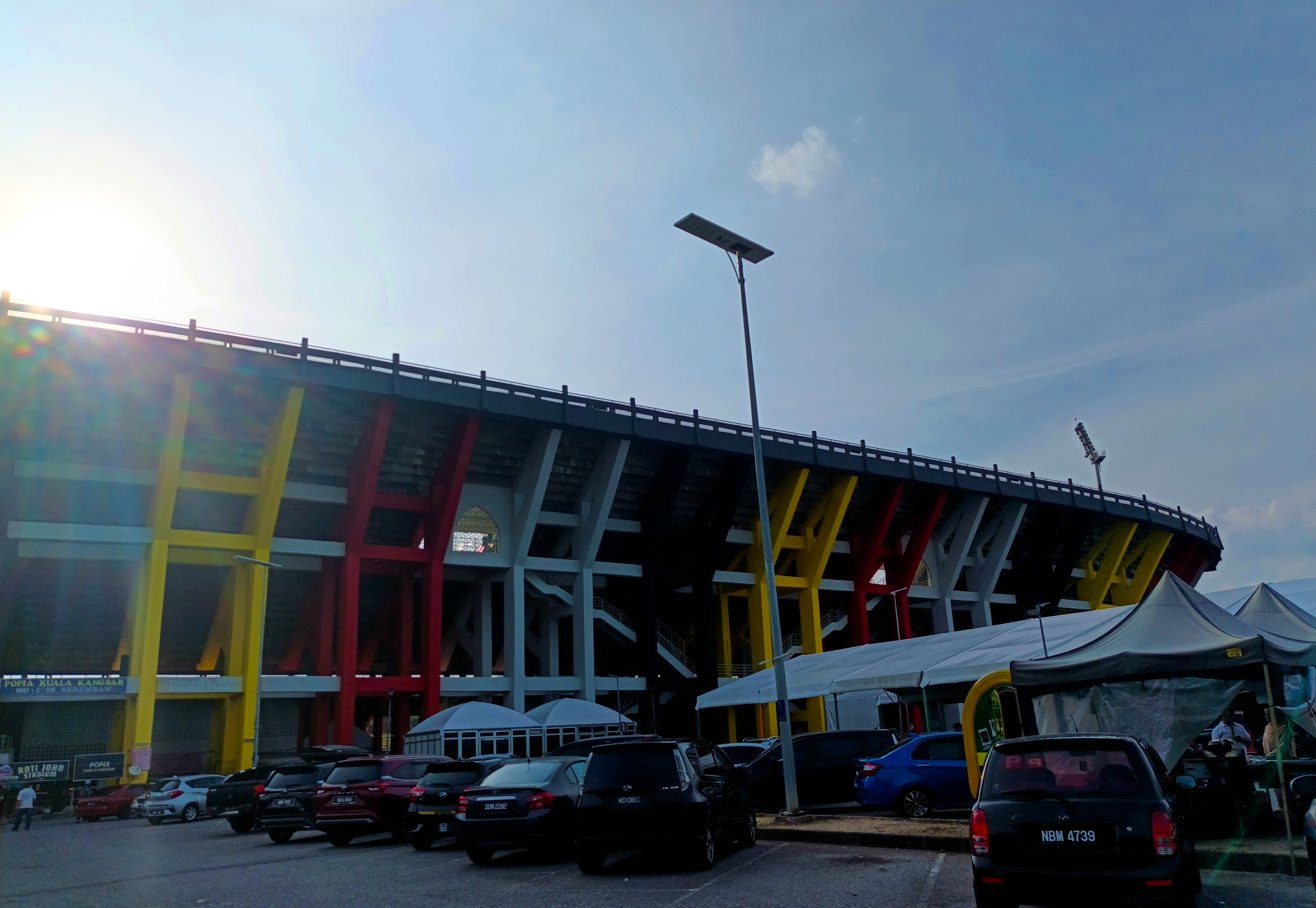
Repainted exterior of the eastern terraces

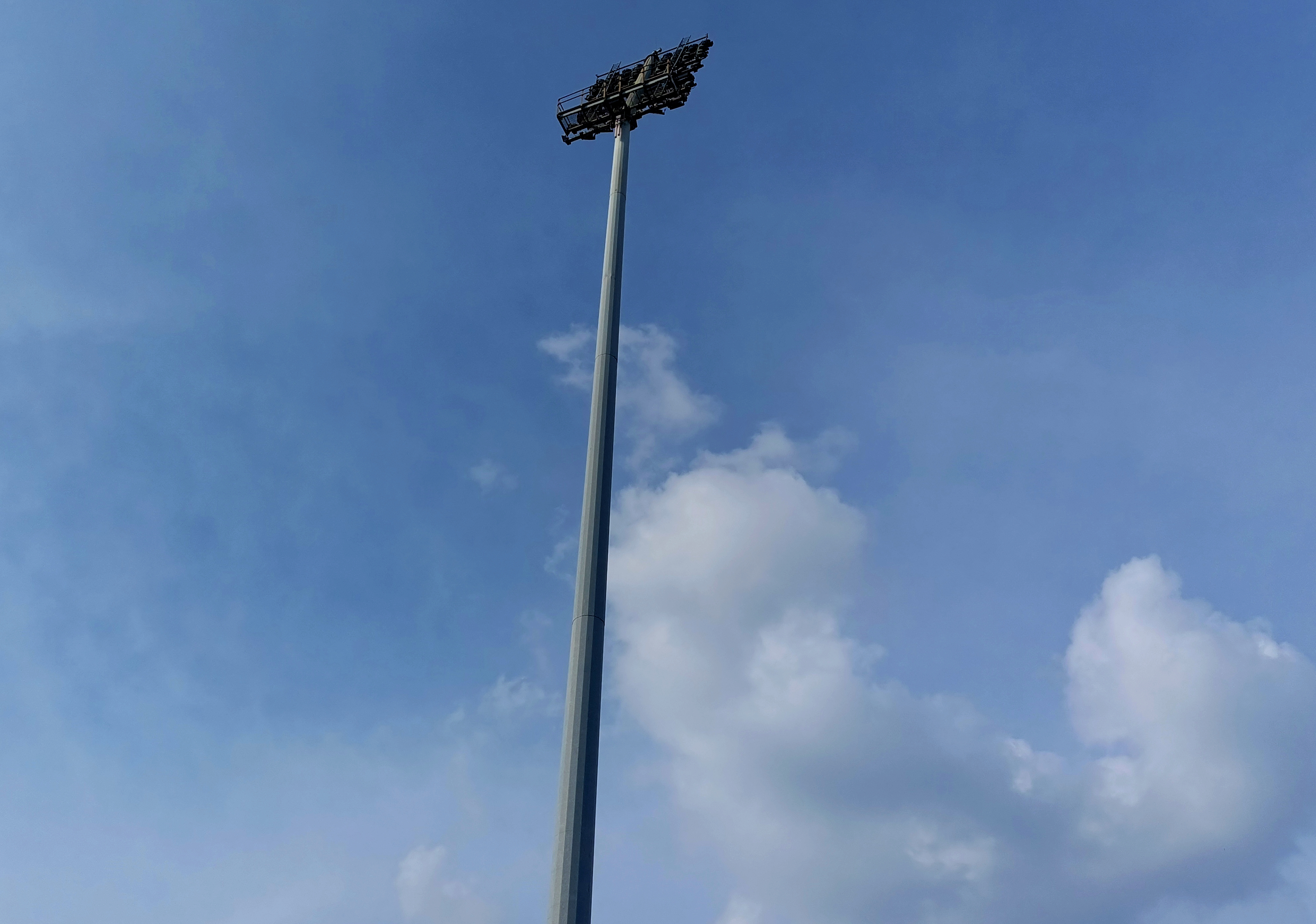
Floodlight tower

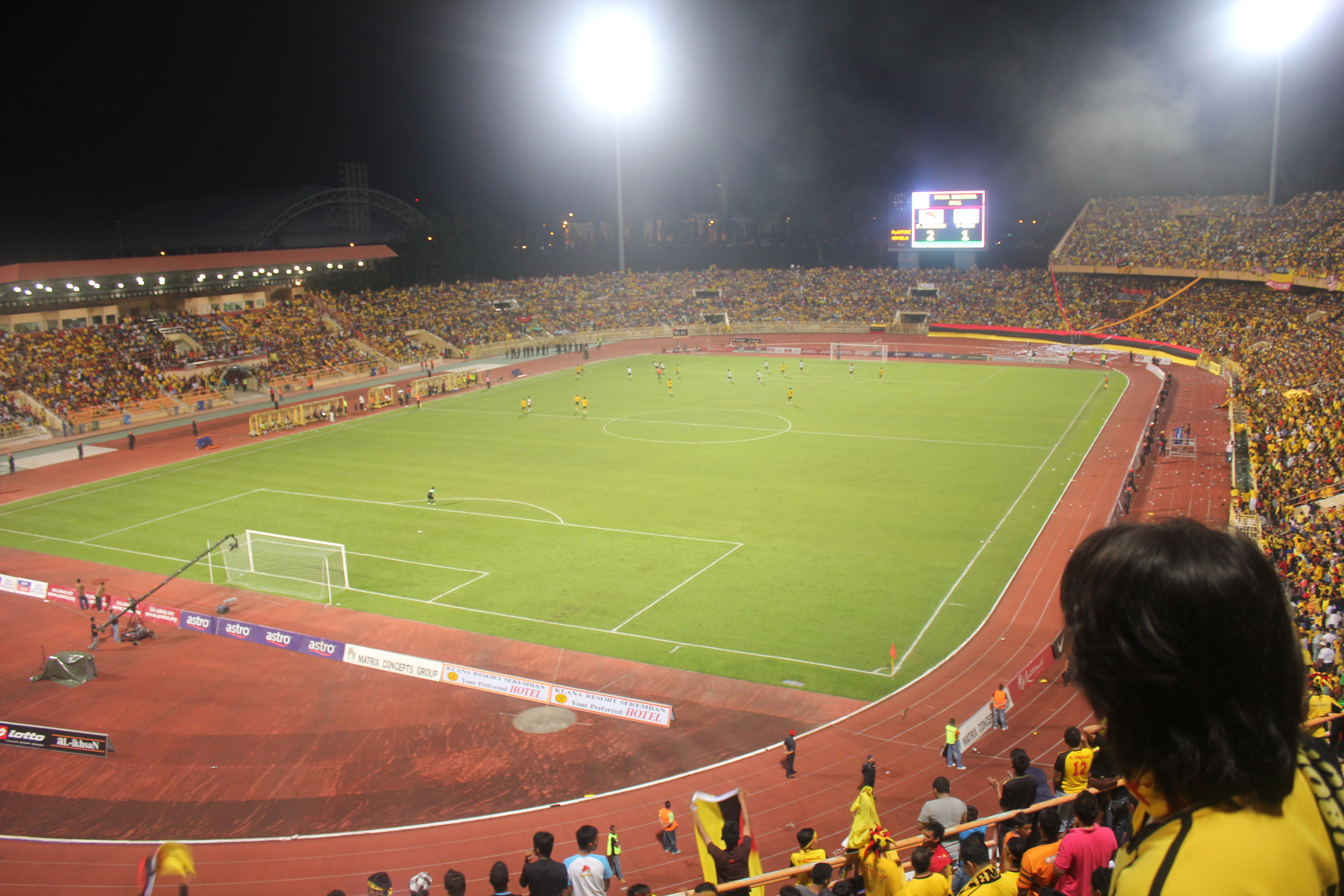
The stadium at full capacity, during the 2011 edition of the Malaysia Super League

== See also ==
- Sport in Malaysia
- List of stadiums in Malaysia
