= Indonesia at the 2021 SEA Games =

- IOC code: INA
- NOC: Indonesian Olympic Committee
- Website: www.nocindonesia.id (in English)

in Hanoi, Vietnam 12–23 May 2022
- Competitors: 499 in 32 sports
- Flag bearer: Emilia Nova (athletics)
- Officials: 214
- Medals Ranked 3rd: Gold 69 Silver 91 Bronze 81 Total 241

SEA Games appearances (overview)
- 1977; 1979; 1981; 1983; 1985; 1987; 1989; 1991; 1993; 1995; 1997; 1999; 2001; 2003; 2005; 2007; 2009; 2011; 2013; 2015; 2017; 2019; 2021; 2023; 2025; 2027; 2029

Indonesia participated at the 2021 SEA Games in Hanoi, Vietnam from 12 to 23 May 2022. The Indonesian contingent consisted of 499 athletes, competing in 32 out 40 sports.

== Medal summary ==
=== Medal by sport ===
Medals by sport
Sport	1st place, gold medalist(s)	2nd place, silver medalist(s)	3rd place, bronze medalist(s)	Total	Rank
Shooting	8	6	2	16	1
Rowing	8	6	0	14	2
Canoeing	6	8	3	17	2
Archery	5	1	0	6	1
Karate	4	8	2	14	2
Wushu	3	9	3	15	2
Finswimming	3	6	3	12	2
Chess	3	4	4	11	2
Cycling	3	4	1	8	2
Weightlifting	3	3	4	10	3
Athletics	2	5	4	11	5
Swimming	2	3	10	15	4
Esports	2	3	1	6	2
Badminton	2	2	5	9	2
Kickboxing	2	1	1	4	4
Volleyball	2	1	1	4	1
Gymnastics	2	0	1	3	5
Pencak silat	1	5	3	9	5
Boxing	1	3	1	5	4
Taekwondo	1	2	9	12	4
Judo	1	1	4	6	4
Bowling	1	1	2	4	3
Tennis	1	1	2	4	3
Basketball	1	1	1	3	2
Sepak takraw	1	1	1	3	2
Vovinam	1	0	5	6	5
Triathlon/Duathlon	0	2	3	5	3
Wrestling	0	2	1	3	5
Golf	0	1	1	2	3
Futsal	0	1	0	1	3
Jujitsu	0	0	2	2	6
Football	0	0	1	1	3
Total	69	91	81	241	3

=== Medal by date ===
Medals by date
Day	Date	1st place, gold medalist(s)	2nd place, silver medalist(s)	3rd place, bronze medalist(s)	Total
-1	11 May	3	4	0	7
0	12 May	Opening ceremony			
1	13 May	4	4	2	10
2	14 May	6	7	6	19
3	15 May	6	13	15	34
4	16 May	4	8	7	19
5	17 May	4	5	10	19
6	18 May	9	8	9	26
7	19 May	6	11	9	26
8	20 May	8	10	7	25
9	21 May	9	9	11	29
10	22 May	10	12	5	27
Total		69	91	81	241

=== Medalists ===
Medal	Name	Sport	Event	Date
Gold	Ardi Isadi; Kakan Kusmana	Rowing	Men's lightweight double sculls	11 May
Gold	La Memo; Sullfianto	Rowing	Men's double sculls	11 May
Gold	Ririn Rinasih; Riska Hermawan	Pencak silat	Women's ganda	11 May
Gold	Ali Buton; Denri Maulidzar Al Ghiffari; Ferdiansyah; Mahendra Yanto	Rowing	Men's lightweight coxless four	13 May
Gold	Ali Mardiansyah; Ardi Isadi; Ihram; Kakan Kusmana	Rowing	Men's quadruple sculls	13 May
Gold	Diandra Ariesta Pieter	Kickboxing	Women's full contact -48kg	13 May
Gold	Amanda La Loupatty	Kickboxing	Women's low kick -52kg	13 May
Gold	Denri Maulidzar Al Ghiffari; Ferdiansyah	Rowing	Men's pair	14 May
Gold	Alisya Mellynar	Wushu	Women's taolu taijiquan	14 May
Gold	Ihram	Rowing	Men's lightweight single sculls	14 May
Gold	Jefri Ardianto; Rio Riski	Rowing	Men's lightweight pair	14 May
Gold	Edwin Ginanjar Rudiana; La Memo; Rifqi Harits Taufiqurrahman; Sulfianto	Rowing	Men's lightweight quadruple	14 May
Gold	Rifda Irfanaluthfi	Gymnastics	Women's artistic individual all-around	14 May
Gold	Dewi Ardhiani Anastasia Citra	Chess	Women's individual standard	15 May
Gold	Seraf Naro Siregar	Wushu	Men's taolu daoshu and gunshu	15 May
Gold	Tiara Andini Prastika	Cycling	Women's downhill individual	15 May
Gold	Junita Malau	Wushu	Women's sanda 48 kg	15 May
Gold	Masniari Wolf	Swimming	Women's 50 m backstroke	15 May
Gold	Shahin Taskhir; Nur Ivaldi Fajar; Richard William Manurung; Ibnu Nasir Ramdani; Victor Innosensius	Esports	Free Fire	15 May
Gold	Dewi Laila Mubarokah	Shooting	Women's 10 m air rifle individual	16 May
Gold	Anang Yulianto; Dewa Putu Yadi Suteja; Totok Tri Martanto	Shooting	Men's 25 m rapid fire pistol team	16 May
Gold	Zaenal Fanani	Cycling	Men's cross-country	16 May
Gold	Rifda Irfanaluthfi	Gymnastics	Women's floor	16 May
Gold	Fathur Gustafian	Shooting	Men's 10 m air rifle individual	17 May
Gold	Hardy Rachmadian; Ryan Leonard Lalisang	Bowling	Men's doubles	17 May
Gold	Eki Febri Ekawati	Athletics	Women's shot put	17 May
Gold	Flairene Candrea Wonomiharjo	Swimming	Women's 100 m backstroke	17 May
Gold	Alviyanto Prastyadi; Arif Dwi Pangestu; Riau Ega Agata Salsabilla	Archery	Men's team recurve	18 May
Gold	Tri Wahyu Buwono; Andri Agus Mulyana; Joko Andriyanto; Sutrisno	Canoeing	Men's K-4 1000 m	18 May
Gold	Citra Dewi Resti; Fathur Gustafian	Shooting	Mixed team air rifle	18 May
Gold	Rezza Octavia; Riau Ega Agata Salsabilla	Archery	Mixed team recurve	18 May
Gold	Rezza Octavia	Archery	Women's individual recurve	18 May
Gold	Arif Dwi Pangestu	Archery	Men's individual recurve	18 May
Gold	Ahmad Zigi Zaresta Yuda	Karate	Men's individual kata	18 May
Gold	Ari Saputra	Karate	Men's kumite 60 kg	18 May
Gold	Muhammad Bassam Raihan	Taekwondo	Men's 63 kg	18 May
Gold	Odekta Elvina Naibaho	Athletics	Women's marathon	19 May
Gold	Prima Wisnu Wardhana; Hendika Putra Pratama; Deki Hastian Adika	Archery	Men's team compound	19 May
Gold	Medina Warda Aulia; Umi Fisabilillah	Chess	Women's team rapid	19 May
Gold	Cok Istri Agung Sanistyarani	Karate	Women's kumite 55 kg	19 May
Gold	Iksan Apriyadi	Judo	Men's 73 kg	19 May
Gold	Saiful Rijal; Muhammad Ardiansyah Muliang; Jelki Ladada	Sepak takraw	Men's doubles	19 May
Gold	Ayustina Delia Priatna	Cycling	Women's road individual time trial	20 May
Gold	Anwar Tarra; Dedi Saputra; Sofiyanto; Yuda Firmansyah	Canoeing	Men's C-4 500 m	20 May
Gold	Stevani Maysche Ibo; Raudani Fitra	Canoeing	Women's K-2 500 m	20 May
Gold	Eko Yuli Irawan	Weightlifting	Men's 61 kg	20 May
Gold	Manik Trisna Dewi Wetan	Vovinam	Women's single weapon practice: Ying- Yang sword form	20 May
Gold	Albiadi; Andy Tomy Aditya Mardana; Andi Dasril Dwi Dharmawan	Karate	Men's team kata	20 May
Gold	Christopher Rungkat; Aldila Sutjiadi	Tennis	Mixed doubles	20 May
Gold	Mohammad Ashfiya; Ade Candra Rachmawan; Rendy Verdian Licardo; Gilang Ramadhan	Volleyball	Men's beach team	20 May
Gold	Andri Agus Mulyana; Joko Andriyanto; Mugi Harjito; Maizir Riyondra	Canoeing	Women's C-4 500 m	21 May
Gold	Stevani Maysche Ibo; Ana Rahayu; Raudani Fitra; Cinta Priendtisca Nayomi	Canoeing	Women's K-4 500 m	21 May
Gold	Chelsie Monica Ignesias Sihite; Ummi Fisabilillah	Chess	Women's team blitz	21 May
Gold	Rahmat Erwin Abdullah	Weightlifting	Men's 73 kg	21 May
Gold	Sella Monim; Dayumin; Riska Andriyani; Nurmeni	Canoeing	Women's C-4 200 m	21 May
Gold	Rica Nensi Perangin Angin	Shooting	Women's individual 10 m running target	21 May
Gold	Nourma Try Indriani; Nurul Sofiah; Rica Nensi Perangin Angin	Shooting	Women's team 10 m running target	21 May
Gold	Harvey Hubert Marcello Hutasuhut	Finswimming	Men's 100 m bi-fins	21 May
Gold	Katherina Eda Rahayu; Ashifa Helsa Ashuroh; Vania Elvira Elent Rahmadan; Andhini Muthia Maulida; Janis Rosalita Suprianto	Finswimming	Women's relay 4x200 m surface	21 May
Gold	Muhammad Zul Ilmi	Weightlifting	Men's 89 kg	22 May
Gold	Anang Yulianto	Shooting	Men's 25 m standard pistol	22 May
Gold	Muhammad Sejahtera Dwi Putra	Shooting	Men's 10 m running target	22 May
Gold	Nizar Julfikar; Dio Zulfikri; Rivan Nurmulki; Dimas Saputra; Rendy Febriant Tamamilang; Doni Haryono; Farhan Halim; Fahry Septian Putratama; Hernanda Zulfi; Muhammad Malizi; Daffa Naufal; Hernanda Zulfi; Yuda Mardiansyah Putra; Fahreza Rakha	Volleyball	Men's indoor	22 May
Gold	Apriyani Rahayu; Siti Fadia Silva Ramadhanti	Badminton	Women's doubles	22 May
Gold	Maikhel Roberrd Muskita	Boxing	Men's –61 kg	22 May
Gold	Leo Rolly Carnando; Daniel Marthin	Badminton	Men's doubles	22 May
Gold	Andakara Prastawa Dhyaksa; Hardianus Lakudu; Yudha Saputera; Abraham Damar Grahita; Agassi Goantara; Arki Dikania Wisnu; Brandon Jawato; Juan Laurent Kokodiputra; Dame Diagne; Derrick Michael Xzavierro; Vincent Rivaldi Kosasih; Marques Bolden	Basketball	Men's 5x5	22 May
Gold	Janis Rosalita Suprianto	Finswimming	Women's 50 m surface	22 May
Gold	Febrianto Genta Prakasa; Muhammad Albi; Genta Effendy; Made Bagus Prabaswara; Jason Kurniawan	Esports	PUBG Mobile team	22 May
Silver	Putri Agni Anugerah; Annisa Meilani Yahya; Maslin Efrilia; Dewi Purwanti	Rowing	Women's quadruple sculls	11 May
Silver	Syiva Lisdiana; Aisah Nabila; Julianti; Chelsea Corputty	Rowing	Women's coxless four	11 May
Silver	Anggi Faisal Mubarok; Asep Yuldan Sani; Nunu Nugraha	Pencak silat	Men's regu	11 May
Silver	Puspa Arumsari	Pencak silat	Women's tunggal	11 May
Silver	Nandhira Mauriskha	Wushu	Women's taolu jianshu	13 May
Silver	Julianti; Chelsea Corputty	Rowing	Women's pair	13 May
Silver	Melani Putri; Mutiara Rahma Putri; Nurtang; Anggi Widiarti	Rowing	Women's lightweight quadruple sculls	13 May
Silver	Salmri Stendra Pattisamallo	Kickboxing	Men's full contact -51kg	13 May
Silver	Harris Horatius	Wushu	Men's taolu nanquan	14 May
Silver	Nicholas	Wushu	Men's taolu taijijian	14 May
Silver	Melani Putri; Mutiara Rahma Putri	Rowing	Women's lightweight double sculls	14 May
Silver	Inge Prasetyo	Triathlon	Women's individual	14 May
Silver	Syiva Lisdiana; Aisah Nabila; Yuniarty; Chelsea Corputty	Rowing	Women's Lightweight coxless four	14 May
Silver	Abdul Hafiz	Athletics	Men's javelin throw	14 May
Silver	Joe Aditya Wijaya Kurniawan; Aflah Fadlan Prawira; Erick Ahmad Fathoni; Glenn Victor Sutanto	Swimming	Men's 4 x 100 freestyle relay	14 May
Silver	Nandhira Mauriskha	Wushu	Women's taolu chanquan	15 May
Silver	Jauhari Johan	Duathlon	Duathlon men's individual	15 May
Silver	Irene Kharisma Sukandar	Chess	Women's individual standard	15 May
Silver	Mohamad Ervan	Chess	Men's individual standard	15 May
Silver	Puja Riyaya	Wushu	Men's sanda 75 kg	15 May
Silver	Rosalina Simajuntak	Wushu	Women's sanda 52 kg	15 May
Silver	Melisa Try Andani	Wushu	Women's sanda 56 kg	15 May
Silver	Laksmana Pandu Pratama	Wushu	Men's sanda 56 kg	15 May
Silver	Amadeus Christian Susanto	Golf	Men's individual	15 May
Silver	Andy Prayoga	Cycling	Men's downhill individual	15 May
Silver	Jumanta	Wushu	Men's 60 kg	15 May
Silver	Agus Suparman; Rehan Maghfur Al Ghifari; Rhama Satria; Muhammad Fikri Alief Pratama; Rafli Aidil Fitrah	Esports	Free Fire	15 May
Silver	Christopher Rungkat; Rifqy Sukma Ramadhan; Muhammad Rifqi Fitriadi; Achad Imam Maruf; Tegar Abdi Satrio Wibowo	Tennis	Men's team	15 May
Silver	Khoirudin Mustakim	Pencak silat	Men's tanding class B	16 May
Silver	Muhamad Yachser Arafa	Pencak silat	Men's tanding class C	16 May
Silver	Citra Dewi Resti; Dewi Laila Mubarokah; Monica Daryanti	Shooting	Women's 10 m air rifle team	16 May
Silver	Ronaldo Neno	Pencak silat	Men's tanding class H	16 May
Silver	Ihza Muhammad	Cycling	Men's cross-country	16 May
Silver	Emilia Nova	Athletics	Women's 100 m hurdles	16 May
Silver	Agustina Mardika Manik	Athletics	Women's 800 m	16 May
Silver	Nurul Fajar Fitriyati	Swimming	Women's 200 m backstroke	16 May
Silver	Riska Andriyani	Canoeing	Women's C-1 1000 m	17 May
Silver	Sharon Limansantoso; Tannya Roumimper	Bowling	Women's doubles	17 May
Silver	Muhammad Aliansyah	Wrestling	Men's Greco-Roman 67 kg	17 May
Silver	Silvana Lamanda	Taekwondo	Women's 67 kg	17 May
Silver	Alan Raynold Kumaseh	Esports	PUBG Mobile individual	17 May
Silver	Maizir Riyondra	Canoeing	Men's K-1 1000 m	18 May
Silver	Sofiyanto; Dedi Saputra; Muhammad Burhan; Muhamad Yunus Rustandi	Canoeing	Men's C-4 1000 m	18 May
Silver	Riau Ega Agata Salsabilla	Archery	Men's individual recurve	18 May
Silver	Gregoria Mariska Tunjung; Putri Kusuma Wardani; Saifi Rizka Nurhidayah; Stephanie Widjaja; Apriyani Rahayu; Siti Fadia Silva Ramadhanti; Ribka Sugiarto; Febby Valencia Dwijayanti Gani; Pitha Haningtyas Mentari; Mychelle Crhystine Bandaso	Badminton	Women's team	18 May
Silver	Devina Dea	Karate	Women's kumite 61 kg	18 May
Silver	Tebing Hutapea	Karate	Men's kumite 67 kg	18 May
Silver	Gagarin Nathaniel	Swimming	Men's 50 m breaststroke	18 May
Silver	Kharisma Tantri Herlina	Wrestling	Women's freestyle 62 kg	18 May
Silver	Agus Prayogo	Athletics	Men's marathon	19 May
Silver	Hendro Yap	Athletics	Men's 20 km walk	19 May
Silver	Muhamad Iqbal Raia Prabowo; Deny Pratama; Wira Sukmana	Shooting	Men's 10 m air pistol team	19 May
Silver	Sella Monim; Ratih; Dayumin; Nurmeni	Canoeing	Women's C-4 1000 m	19 May
Silver	Indra Hidayat; Irwan	Canoeing	Men's K-2 1000 m	19 May
Silver	Ceyco Georgia Zefanya	Karate	Women's kumite 68 kg	19 May
Silver	Ignatius Joshua Kandou	Karate	Men's kumite 75 kg	19 May
Silver	Dessyinta Rakawuni Banurea	Karate	Women's kumite +68 kg	19 May
Silver	Anugerah Nurul Lucky; Dian Monika Nababan; Emilia Sri Hanandyta	Karate	Women's team kata	19 May
Silver	Nicolas Armanto	Taekwondo	Men's 87 kg	19 May
Silver	Adylia Safitri	Shooting	Women's trap	19 May
Silver	Dayumin; Nurmeni	Canoeing	Women's C-2 500 m	20 May
Silver	Riska Andriyani	Canoeing	Women's C-1 500 m	20 May
Silver	Rivaldi Fatah; Albert Neilsen Iskandar; Ihsan Besari Kusudana; Calvin Winata; Calvin; Gilang; Nicky Fernando	Esports	Mobile Legends: Bang Bang	20 May
Silver	Aiman Cahyadi	Cycling	Men's road individual time trial	20 May
Silver	Chelsie Monica Ignesias Sihite	Chess	Women's blitz	20 May
Silver	Mohammad Yasin	Weightlifting	Men's 67 kg	20 May
Silver	Sharon Verlina Ririhena; Cok Istri Agung Sanistyarani; Devina Dea; Ceyco Georgia Zefanya; Dessyinta Rakawuni Banurea	Karate	Women's team kumite	20 May
Silver	Muhammad Albagir; Muhammad Nizar; Rio Pangestu; Marvin Alexa; Rizki Xavier; Ardiansyah Nur; Ardiansyah Runtuboy; Mochammad Iqbal; Firman Adriansyah; Syauqi Saud; Dewa Rizki; Reza Gunawan	Futsal	Men's team	20 May
Silver	Ari Saputra; Nurhalim Arlendi; Tebing Hutapea; Ignatius Joshua Kandou; Claudio Nenobesi; Sandi Firmansyah	Karate	Men's team kumite	20 May
Silver	Putu Dini Jasita Utami; Dhita Juliana; Nur Atika Sari; Sari Hartati	Volleyball	Women's beach team	20 May
Silver	Nur Meni; Dayumin; Sella Monim; Riska Andriyani	Canoeing	Women's C-4 500 m	21 May
Silver	Susanto Megaranto; Muhammad Lutfi Ali	Chess	Men's team blitz	21 May
Silver	Fathur Gustafian	Shooting	Men's 50 m rifle three position	21 May
Silver	Nourma Try Indriani	Shooting	Women's individual 10 m running target	21 May
Silver	Aiman Cahyadi	Cycling	Men's road individual mass start	21 May
Silver	Rizki Juniansyah	Weightlifting	Men's 81 kg	21 May
Silver	Muhammad Hardiansyah Muliang; Saiful Rijal; Andi Try Sandi Saputra; Abdul Halim Radjiu	Sepak takraw	Men's quadrant	21 May
Silver	Janis Rosalita Suprianto	Finswimming	Women's 100 m surface	21 May
Silver	Bima Dea Sakti Antono; Petrol Apostle Gasoline Kambey; Dio Novandra Wibawa; Wahyu Anggoro Tamtomo	Finswimming	Men's relay 4x200 m surface	21 May
Silver	Nurul Akmal	Weightlifting	Women's +71 kg	22 May
Silver	Adelaide Wongsohardjo Callista; Agustin Gradita Retong; Clarita Antonio; Angelica Jennifer Candra; Dyah Lestari; Gabriel Sophia; Henny Sutjiono; Kade Dewi Pratita Citta; Kimberley Pierre Louis; Mega Nanda Perdana Putri; Nathania Orville; Yuni Anggraeni	Basketball	Women's 5x5	22 May
Silver	Farrand Papendang	Boxing	Men's –63 kg	22 May
Silver	Muhammad Chuwai Zam; Muhammad Sejahtera Dwi Putra; Irfandi Julio	Shooting	Men's team 10 m running target	22 May
Silver	Sarohatua Lumbantobing	Boxing	Men's –69 kg	22 May
Silver	Pramudya Kusumawardana; Yeremia Rambitan	Badminton	Men's doubles	22 May
Silver	Huswatun Hasanah	Boxing	Women's –60 kg	22 May
Silver	Iksan Apriyadi; Gede Ganding Kalbu Soethama; I Gede Agastya Darma Wardana; Ni Kadek Anny Pandini; I Gusti Ayu Putu Guna Kakihara; I Dewa Ayu Mira Widari	Judo	Mixed team	22 May
Silver	Wahyu Anggoro Tamtono	Finswimming	Men's 50 m surface	22 May
Silver	Andini Muthia Maulida	Finswimming	Women's 800 m surface	22 May
Silver	Harvey Hubert Marcello Hutasuhut; Andityo Panigoro; Joanita Mutiara Hapsari; Raqiel Az Zahra	Finswimming	Mixed relay 4x100 m bi-fins	22 May
Silver	Ashifa Helsa Ashuroh; Vania Elvira Elent Rahmadan; Andhini Muthia Maulida; Janis Rosalita Suprianto	Finswimming	Women's relay 4x100 m surface	22 May
Bronze	Nadya Nakhoir	Kickboxing	Women's full contact -48kg	13 May
Bronze	Seraf Naro Siregar	Wushu	Men's taolu changquan	13 May
Bronze	Ronald Setiawan Bintang	Triathlon	Men's individual	14 May
Bronze	Adelaide Wongsohardjo Calista; Dewa Ayu Made Sriartha Kusuma Dewi; Kimberley Pierre Louis; Nathania Claresta Orville	3x3 Basketball	Women's 3x3	14 May
Bronze	Gagarin Nathaniel	Swimming	Men's 100 m breaststroke	14 May
Bronze	Farrel Armandio Tangkas	Swimming	Men's 100 m backstroke	14 May
Bronze	Maria Natalia Londa	Athletics	Women's long jump	14 May
Bronze	Sunardi Muliawan	Jujitsu	Men's U 62 kg - GI	14 May
Bronze	Rudi Febriade	Duathlon	Duathlon men's individual	15 May
Bronze	Harris Horatius	Wushu	Men's taolu nangun	15 May
Bronze	Beatrice Gumulya; Aldila Sutjiadi; Jessy Rompies; Fitriani Sabatini; Novela Rezha Millenia Putri	Tennis	Women's team	15 May
Bronze	Zahra Putri Bulan Aprilia	Duathlon	Duathlon Women's individual	15 May
Bronze	Thania Kusumaningtyas	Wushu	Women's sanda 60 kg	15 May
Bronze	Rifda Irfanaluthfi	Gymnastics	Women's vault Table	15 May
Bronze	Muhammad Nurul Fikri	Jujitsu	Men's U 69 kg - GI	15 May
Bronze	Anak Agung Istri Kania Ratih Atmaja	Swimming	Women's 50 m backstroke	15 May
Bronze	Sapwaturrahman	Athletics	Men's triple jump	15 May
Bronze	Glenn Victor Sutanto	Swimming	Men's 50 m butterfly	15 May
Bronze	Aflah Fadlan Prawira	Swimming	Men's 400 m individual medley	15 May
Bronze	Ressa Kania Dewi; Nurul Fajar Fitriyati; Angel Gabriella Yus; Patricia Yosita Hapsari	Swimming	Women's 400 m freestyle relay	15 May
Bronze	Firdhana Wahyu Putra	Pencak silat	Men's tanding class J	15 May
Bronze	Tri Juwanda Bahar	Pencak silat	Men's tanding open	15 May
Bronze	Rahmawati	Pencak silat	Women's tanding class F	15 May
Bronze	Ryan Leonard Lalisang	Bowling	Men's singles	16 May
Bronze	Muhammad Rizal; Muhammad Hafizh Fachrur Rhozy; Muhammad Alfi Kusuma	Taekwondo	Men's team poomsae	16 May
Bronze	Muhammad Alfi Kusuma	Taekwondo	Men's individual poomsae	16 May
Bronze	Defia Rosmaniar	Taekwondo	Women's individual poomsae	16 May
Bronze	Atjong Tio Purwanto	Athletics	Men's 3000 m steeplechase	16 May
Bronze	Farrel Armandio Tangkas	Swimming	Men's 200 m backstroke	16 May
Bronze	Maria Natalia Londa	Athletics	Women's triple jump	16 May
Bronze	Raudani Fitra; Cinta Priendtisca Nayomi; Stevani Maysche Ibo; Ana Rahayu	Canoeing	Women's K-4 1000 m	17 May
Bronze	Paragra Duncan Taruma Negara	Shooting	Men's 10 m air rifle individual	17 May
Bronze	Susanto Megaranto	Chess	Men's rapid	17 May
Bronze	Azarya Jodi Setyaki	Chess	Men's rapid	17 May
Bronze	Reinaldy Atmanegara	Taekwondo	Men's 54 kg	17 May
Bronze	Andika Sulaeman	Wrestling	Men's Greco-Roman 77 kg	17 May
Bronze	Ni Kadek Heni Prikasih	Taekwondo	Women's 46 kg	17 May
Bronze	Muhammad Hardiansyah Muliang; Saiful Rijal; Abdul Halim Radjiu	Sepak takraw	Men's regu	17 May
Bronze	Christian Adinata; Leo Rolly Carnando; Chico Aura Dwi Wardoyo; Pramudya Kusumawardana; Daniel Marthin; Adnan Maulana; Yeremia Rambitan; Yonathan Ramlie; Rinov Rivaldy; Bobby Setiabudi	Badminton	Men's team	17 May
Bronze	I Gede Siman Sudartawa	Swimming	Men's 50 m backstroke	17 May
Bronze	Devita Safitri; Reski Wahyuni	Canoeing	Women's C-2 1000 m	18 May
Bronze	Naraajie Emerald Ramadhan Putra; Amadeus Christian Susanto; Randy Arbenata Mohamad Bintang	Golf	Men's team	18 May
Bronze	Sharon Verlina Ririhena	Karate	Women's kumite 50 kg	18 May
Bronze	Osanando Naufal Khairudin	Taekwondo	Men's 74 kg	18 May
Bronze	Krisda Putri Aprilia	Karate	Women's individual kata	18 May
Bronze	Mariska Halinda	Taekwondo	Women's 57 kg	18 May
Bronze	Megawati Tamesti Maheswari	Taekwondo	Women's 53 kg	18 May
Bronze	Azzahra Permatahani	Swimming	Women's 400 m individual medley	18 May
Bronze	Efrie Surya Perdana; I Wayan Wisma Pratama Putra; Ni Made Ayu Ratih Daneswari; I Gusti Agung Ngurah Suardyana	Vovinam	Women's multiple weapon practice: 1 female defense against 3 others with weapon	18 May
Bronze	Cinta Priendtisca Nayom; Raudani Fitra	Canoeing	Women's K-2 1000 m	19 May
Bronze	Novendra Priasmoro; Yoseph Theolifus Taher	Chess	Men's team rapid	19 May
Bronze	Siti Nafisatul Hariroh	Weightlifting	Women's 45 kg	19 May
Bronze	Muhamad Iqbal Raia Prabowo	Shooting	Men's 10 m air pistol individual	19 May
Bronze	Dinda Putri Lestari	Taekwondo	Women's 62 kg	19 May
Bronze	Gede Ganding Kalbu Soethama	Judo	Men's 90 kg	19 May
Bronze	Putty Insavilla Armein; Sharon Adelina Liman Santoso; Shinta Ceysaria Yunita; Tannya Roumimper	Bowling	Women's team of four	19 May
Bronze	Azzahra Permatahani; Ressa Kania Dewi; Angel Gabriella Yus; Patricia Yosita Hapsari	Swimming	Women's 4x200 m freestyle relay	19 May
Bronze	Novita Sinadia	Boxing	Women's –51 kg	19 May
Bronze	Susanto Megaranto	Chess	Men's blitz	20 May
Bronze	Natasya Beteyob	Weightlifting	Women's 55 kg	20 May
Bronze	Dewa Kadek Rama Warma Putra	Judo	Men's 66 kg	20 May
Bronze	Muhammad Aliansyah	Judo	Men's 60 kg	20 May
Bronze	I Nyoman Suryawan; I Wayan Sumertayasa; Dwi Gede Tomi Sanjaya	Vovinam	Men's multiple weapon practice: 01 player defends against 03 others with weapon	20 May
Bronze	Manik Trisna Dewi Wetan	Vovinam	Women's single hand practice: Dragon tiger form	20 May
Bronze	Beatrice Gumulya; Jessy Rompies	Tennis	Women's doubles	20 May
Bronze	Tsabitha Alfiah Ramadani	Weightlifting	Women's 64 kg	21 May
Bronze	Putri Kusuma Wardani	Badminton	Women's singles	21 May
Bronze	Gregoria Mariska Tunjung	Badminton	Women's singles	21 May
Bronze	Rinov Rivaldy; Pitha Haningtyas Mentari	Badminton	Mixed doubles	21 May
Bronze	Meli Rosita Marta	Judo	Women's 48 kg	21 May
Bronze	I Wayan Wisnu Pratama Putra; Efrie Surya Perdana	Vovinam	Men's couple weapon practice: Pair machete form	21 May
Bronze	Kadek Dwi Dharmadi	Vovinam	Men's single weapon practice: Four - Element staff form	21 May
Bronze	Adnan Maulana; Mychelle Crhystine Bandaso	Badminton	Mixed doubles	21 May
Bronze	Restu Anggi	Weightlifting	Women's 71 kg	21 May
Bronze	Andityo Panigoro	Finswimming	Men's 100 m bi-fins	21 May
Bronze	Amalia Fajrina Nabila; Arsela Nuari Purnama; Megawati Hangestri Pertiwi; Nandita Ayu Salsabila; Ratri Wulandari; Shella Bernadetha Onnan; Tisya Amallya Putri; Wilda Nurfadhilah; Yolana Betha Pangestika; Yolla Yuliana; Dita Azizah; Shintia Alliva Mauludina	Volleyball	Women's indoor	21 May
Bronze	Ayustina Delia Priatna	Cycling	Women's road individual mass start	22 May
Bronze	Adi Satryo; Alfeandra Dewangga; Firza Andika; Rizky Ridho; Marc Klok; Marselino Ferdinan; Witan Sulaeman; Ronaldo Kwateh; Egy Maulana Vikri; Saddil Ramdani; Muhamad Ridwan; Rachmat Irianto; Asnawi Mangkualam; Ricky Kambuaya; Ilham Rio Fahmi; Syahrian Abimanyu; Irfan Jauhari; Fachruddin Aryanto; Ernando Ari Sutaryadi	Football	Men's team	22 May
Bronze	Katherina Eda Rahayu	Finswimming	Women's 800 m surface	22 May
Bronze	Bima Dea Sakti Antono; Petrol Apostle Gasoline Kambey; Dio Novandra Wibawa; Muhammad Zidan Arrif Billah	Finswimming	Men's relay 4x100 m surface	22 May
Bronze	Derry Alviano; Evan Jordan; Gian Kurnadi; Samuel Santosa; Yudi Kurniawan; Riddho Putra Muharam; Jason Ardian	Esports	Cross Fire	22 May

== Archery ==
Recurve

Athlete	Event	Qualification Round		Round of 8		Quarterfinals		Semi-finals		Finals	Rank
Athlete	Event	Score	Seed	Score	Seed	Score	Seed	Score	Seed	Opposition Score	Rank
Riau Ega Agatha	Men's individual	656	2	No result		7	1	6	1	Pangestu (INA); L 2–6	2nd place, silver medalist(s)
Arif Dwi Pangestu	Men's individual	660	1	No result		7	2	6	1	Agatha (INA); W 6–2	1st place, gold medalist(s)
Alviyanto Prastiyadi Bagas	Men's individual	633	13	Did not advance							
Lisnawanto Aditya Putra	Men's individual	627	17	Did not advance							
Alviyanto Prastiyadi Bagas; Arif Dwi Pangestu; Riau Ega Agatha	Men's team	—N/a				No result		5	2	Vietnam (VIE); W 6–2	1st place, gold medalist(s)
Rezza Octavia	Women's individual	643	1	No result		6	4	6	2	Khunhiranchaiyo (THA) W 6–0	1st place, gold medalist(s)
Pande Putu Gina Putri	Women's individual	583	17	1	—N/a	Did not advance					
Riau Ega Agatha; Rezza Octavia	Mixed Team	—N/a				No result		5	1	Malaysia (MAS); W 6–2	1st place, gold medalist(s)

Compound

Athlete	Event	Qualification Round		Round of 8		Quarterfinals		Semi-finals		Finals	Rank
Athlete	Event	Score	Seed	Score	Seed	Score	Seed	Score	Seed	Opposition Score	Rank
Deki Hastian Adika	Men's individual	696	5	138	9	Did not advance					
Hendika Putra Pratama	Men's individual	695	7	Did not advance							
Prima Wardhana Wisnu	Men's individual	696	6	138	10	Did not advance					
Prima Wardhana Wisnu; Hendika Putra Pratama; Deki Hastian Adika	Men's team	—N/a				235	1	232	2	Malaysia (MAS); W 230–229	1st place, gold medalist(s)
Sri Ranti	Women's individual	678	7	137	—N/a	134	7	Did not advance			
Sri Ranti; Prima Wardhana Wisnu	Mixed Team	—N/a				151	7	Did not advance			

== Badminton ==
Men

Athlete	Event	Round of 16	Quarterfinal	Semifinal	Final	
Athlete	Event	Opposition Score	Opposition Score	Opposition Score	Opposition Score	Rank
Chico Aura Dwi Wardoyo	Singles	S Rikreay (CAM); W (21–10, 21–12)	J Teh (SIN); L (16–21, 16–21)	did not advance		
Christian Adinata	Singles	Nguyễn T M (VIE); L (12–21, 19–21)	did not advance			
Pramudya Kusumawardana; Yeremia Rambitan	Doubles	J Arif / M Haikal (MAS); W (21–13, 17–21, 21–14)	S J Padiz / J Villabrille (PHI); W (21–17, 21–14)	T Hee / Loh K H (SIN); W (15–21, 21–17, 21–19)	L R Carnando / D Marthin (INA); L (17–21, 19–21)	2nd place, silver medalist(s)
Leo Rolly Carnando; Daniel Marthin	Doubles	V Phichith / B Vanthanouvong (LAO); W (21–9, 21–13)	C Charoenkitamorn / N Yordphaisong (THA); W (21–15, 17–21, 21–15)	Đỗ T Đ / Phạm H N (VIE); W (22–20, 21–16)	P Kusumawardana / Y Rambitan (INA); W (21–17, 21–19)	1st place, gold medalist(s)
Chico Aura Dwi Wardoyo; Christian Adinata; Bobby Setiabudi; Yonathan Ramlie; Pramudya Kusumawardana; Yeremia Rambitan; Leo Rolly Carnando; Daniel Marthin; Rinov Rivaldy; Adnan Maulana	Team	—N/a	Cambodia (CAM); W 3–0	Thailand (THA); L 2–3	Did not advance	3rd place, bronze medalist(s)

Women

Athlete	Event	Round of 16	Quarterfinal	Semifinal	Final	
Athlete	Event	Opposition Score	Opposition Score	Opposition Score	Opposition Score	Rank
Gregoria Mariska Tunjung	Singles	Vũ T T (VIE); W (17–21, 21–5, 21–14)	M J D Guzman (PHI); W (21–9, 21–7)	P Chaiwan (THA); L (18–21, 15–21)	Did not advance	3rd place, bronze medalist(s)
Putri Kusuma Wardani	Singles	Nguyễn T L (VIE); W (21–9, 21–17)	S J Barredo (PHI); W (21–11, 21–9)	P Chochuwong (THA); L (16–21, 9–21)	Did not advance	3rd place, bronze medalist(s)
Apriyani Rahayu; Siti Fadia Silva Ramadhanti	Doubles	Đinh T P H Đỗ T H (VIE) / W (21–15, 21–15)	J Kititharakul / R Prajongjai (THA); W (21–15, 22–20)	I Khan / B Lim Z R (SIN); W (21–10, 21–7)	B Aimsaard / N Aimsaard (THA); W (21–17, 21–14)	1st place, gold medalist(s)
Ribka Sugiarto; Febby Valencia Dwijayanti Gani	Doubles	Jin Y / C Wong J Y (SIN); W (21–17, 21–18)	B Aimsaard / N Aimsaard (THA); L (17–21, 20–22)	did not advance		
Gregoria Mariska Tunjung; Putri Kusuma Wardani; Saifi Rizki Nurhidayah; Stephanie Widjaja; Apriyani Rahayu; Siti Fadia Silva Ramadhanti; Ribka Sugiarto; Febby Valencia Dwijayanti Gani; Pitha Haningtyas Mentari; Mychelle Chrystine Bandaso	Team	—N/a	Bye	Vietnam (VIE); W 3–1	Thailand (THA); L 0–3	2nd place, silver medalist(s)

Mixed

Athlete	Event	Round of 16	Quarterfinal	Semifinal	Final	
Athlete	Event	Opposition Score	Opposition Score	Opposition Score	Opposition Score	Rank
Rinov Rivaldy; Pitha Haningtyas Mentari	Mixed	A Morada / T M Pomar (PHI); W (21–15, 19–21, 21–15)	P Teeraratsakul / P Muenwong (THA); W (21–10, 16–21, 21–15)	Chen T J / Peck Y W (MAS); L (22–20, 13–21, 18–21)	Did not advance	3rd place, bronze medalist(s)
Adnan Maulana; Mychelle Chrystine Bandaso	Mixed	H Mengleap / P Chenda (CAM); W (21–4, 21–6)	Đỗ T Đ / Phạm N T (VIE); W (21–9, 21–10)	Hoo P R / Cheah Y S (MAS); L (21–18, 16–21, 17–21)	Did not advance	3rd place, bronze medalist(s)

== Basketball ==
=== 5x5 Basketball ===
==== Men's tournament ====
Team	Event	Round-robin						
Team	Event	Opposition Score	Opposition Score	Opposition Score	Opposition Score	Opposition Score	Opposition Score	Rank
Indonesia men's	Men's 5x5	Malaysia; W 95–92 (OT)	Thailand; W 78–75	Cambodia; W 94–44	Singapore; W 91–61	Vietnam; W 94–67	Philippines; W 85–81	1st place, gold medalist(s)

Roster

Indonesia men's 5x5 basketball final roster at SEA Games 2021

Indonesia men's national basketball Team roster
Players
Coaches

Pos.	No.	Name	Age – Date of birth	Height	Club	Ctr.
PG	7	Andakara Prastawa Dhyaksa	29 – August 16, 1992	1.73 m (5 ft 8 in)	Pelita Jaya Bakrie Jakarta	(Indonesia)
PG	2	Hardianus Lakudu	30 – March 3, 1992	1.76 m (5 ft 9 in)	Satria Muda Pertamina Jakarta	(Indonesia)
PG	11	Yudha Saputera	23 – November 21, 1998	1.68 m (5 ft 6 in)	Prawira Bandung	(Indonesia)
SG	4	Abraham Damar Grahita	26 – October 8, 1995	1.80 m (5 ft 11 in)	Prawira Bandung	(Indonesia)
SG	24	Agassi Goantara	22 – October 17, 1999	1.87 m (6 ft 2 in)	CB Alhama Baloncesto	(Spain)
SF	33	Arki Dikania Wisnu	34 – March 15, 1988	1.87 m (6 ft 2 in)	Satria Muda Pertamina Jakarta	(Indonesia)
SF	3	Brandon Jawato	28 – June 3, 1993	1.93 m (6 ft 4 in)	Utsunomiya Brex	(Japan)
PF	0	Juan Laurent Kokodiputra	26 – July 15, 1995	1.93 m (6 ft 4 in)	Satria Muda Pertamina Jakarta	(Indonesia)
PF	29	Dame Diagne	16 – July 29, 2005	1.96 m (6 ft 5 in)	Indonesia Patriots	(Indonesia)
PF	1	Derrick Michael Xzavierro	19 – April 1, 2003	2.06 m (6 ft 9 in)	Grand Canyon Antelopes	(United States)
C	15	Vincent Rivaldi Kosasih	25 – June 17, 1996	2.03 m (6 ft 8 in)	Pelita Jaya Bakrie Jakarta	(Indonesia)
C	22	Marques Bolden	24 – April 17, 1998	2.08 m (6 ft 10 in)	Salt Lake City Stars	(United States)

Head coach

- (Serbia) Miloš Pejić

Assistant coach(es)

- (Serbia) Rajko Toroman
- (Indonesia) Johannis Winar
- (Indonesia) Wahyu Widayat Jati

Legend

- Club – describes last
  club before the tournament
- Age – describes age
  on May 12, 2022

Group play
(Round-robin)

Pos	Team	Pld	W	L	PF	PA	PD	Pts	Final Result
1	Indonesia	6	6	0	537	420	+117	12	Gold medal
2	Philippines	6	5	1	520	331	+189	11	Silver medal
3	Thailand	5	3	2	435	289	+146	8	Bronze medal
4	Vietnam (H)	5	3	2	397	394	+3	8	
5	Malaysia	6	2	4	392	470	−78	8	
6	Singapore	6	1	5	373	492	−119	7	
7	Cambodia	6	0	6	271	529	−258	6	

Updated to match(es) played on 21 May 2021. Source: FIBA
(H) Hosts

==== Women's tournament ====
Team	Event	Round-robin					
Team	Event	Opposition Score	Opposition Score	Opposition Score	Opposition Score	Opposition Score	Rank
Indonesia women's	Women's 5x5	Philippines; L 77–93	Vietnam; W 93–80	Malaysia; W 70–52	Thailand; W 76–64	Singapore; W 87–53	2nd place, silver medalist(s)

Roster

Indonesia women's 5x5 basketball final roster at SEA Games 2021

Indonesia women's national basketball Team roster
Players
Coaches

Pos.	No.	Name	Age – Date of birth	Height	Club	Ctr.
F	1	Dyah Lestari	24 – May 4, 1998	174 m (570 ft 10 in)
PG	2	Agustin Retong Elya Gradita	26 – August 24, 1995	167 m (547 ft 11 in)
SG	7	Kadek Dewi Pratita Citta	26 – August 13, 1995	168 m (551 ft 2 in)
PG	12	Adelaide Callista Wongsohardjo	20 – October 12, 2001	174 m (570 ft 10 in)
PF	13	Yuni Anggraeni	27 – June 28, 1994	175 m (574 ft 2 in)
C	21	Nathania Claresta Orville	21 – August 3, 2000	176 m (577 ft 5 in)
C	22	Gabriel Sophia	30 – November 22, 1991	172 m (564 ft 4 in)
SF	24	Mega Nanda Perdana Putri	31 – June 24, 1990	169 m (554 ft 6 in)
SF	25	Henny Sutijono (c)	28 – February 2, 1994	168 m (551 ft 2 in)
PF	26	Kimberley Pierre Louis	28 – August 11, 1993	183 m (600 ft 5 in)
C	71	Clarita Antonio	22 – July 1, 1999	178 m (584 ft 0 in)
C	99	Angelica Jennifer Candra	16 – July 5, 2005	180 m (590 ft 7 in)

Head coach

- (Chinese Taipei) Lin Chi-wen

Legend

- Club – describes last
  club before the tournament
- Age – describes age
  on May 12, 2022

Group play
(Round-robin)

Pos	Team	Pld	W	L	PF	PA	PD	Pts	Final Result
1	Philippines	5	4	1	491	402	+89	9	Gold medal
2	Indonesia	5	4	1	403	342	+61	9	Silver medal
3	Malaysia	5	3	2	355	336	+19	8	Bronze medal
4	Thailand	5	2	3	378	358	+20	7	
5	Vietnam (H)	5	2	3	384	405	−21	7	
6	Singapore	5	0	5	243	411	−168	5	

Updated to match(es) played on 21 May 2022. Source: FIBA
(H) Hosts

=== 3x3 Basketball ===
==== Men's tournament ====
Team	Event	Qualifying							Semifinal	Final / BM	
Team	Event	Opposition Score	Opposition Score	Opposition Score	Opposition Score	Opposition Score	Opposition Score	Rank	Opposition Score	Opposition Score	Rank
Indonesia men's 3×3	Men's 3×3	Singapore; L 15-21	Malaysia; W 20–19	Vietnam; L 10–22	Philippines; W 15–13	Thailand; L 12-21	Cambodia; W 19-16	4 Q	Vietnam; L 15-21	Philippines; L 10-14	4

Team roster

- Ibrahim Aziz
- Jamarr Andre Johnson
- Oki Wira
- Surliyadin

Group play

Pos	Team	Pld	W	L	GF	GA	GD	Pts	Qualification
1	Vietnam (H)	6	5	1	125	91	+34	11	Advanced to Semifinals
2	Philippines	6	4	2	108	89	+19	10 (Note: Thailand 16–21 Philippines)	Advanced to Semifinals
3	Thailand	6	4	2	120	95	+25	10	Advanced to Semifinals
4	Indonesia	6	3	3	91	112	−21	9 (Note: Malaysia 19–20 Indonesia)	Advanced to Semifinals
5	Malaysia	6	3	3	110	109	+1	9	
6	Singapore	6	2	4	100	112	−12	8	
7	Cambodia	6	0	6	77	123	−46	6	

Updated to match(es) played on unknown. Source: 2021 SEA GAMES
Rules for classification: 1) Points; 2) Head-to-head results; 3) Points for;
(H) Hosts
Notes:

13 May 2022
9:00

Indonesia	15–21	Singapore

Thanh Tri Gymnasium

13 May 2022
11:20

Malaysia	19–20	Indonesia

Thanh Tri Gymnasium

13 May 2022
14:20

Vietnam	22–10	Indonesia

Thanh Tri Gymnasium

13 May 2022
16:20

Indonesia	15–13	Philippines

Thanh Tri Gymnasium

14 May 2022
10:20

Indonesia	19–16	Cambodia

Thanh Tri Gymnasium

14 May 2022
12:00

Indonesia	12–21	Thailand

Thanh Tri Gymnasium

Semifinal

14 May 2022
16:09

Vietnam	21–15	Indonesia

Thanh Tri Gymnasium

Bronze medal match

14 May 2022
17:12

Indonesia	10–14	Philippines

Thanh Tri Gymnasium

==== Women's tournament ====
Team	Event	Qualifying							Semifinal	Final / BM	
Team	Event	Opposition Score	Opposition Score	Opposition Score	Opposition Score	Opposition Score	Opposition Score	Rank	Opposition Score	Opposition Score	Rank
Indonesia women's 3×3	Women's 3×3	Vietnam; W 19-18	Thailand; L 17–20	Singapore; W 21–8	Malaysia; W 21–11	Philippines; W 21-12	Cambodia; W 21-7	2 Q	Vietnam; L 16-19	Philippines; W 16-10	3rd place, bronze medalist(s)

Team roster

- Adelaide Wongsohardjo Calista
- Dewa Ayu Made Sriartha Kusuma Dewi
- Kimberley Pierre Louis
- Nathania Claresta Orville

Group play

Pos	Team	Pld	W	L	GF	GA	GD	Pts	Qualification
1	Thailand	6	6	0	126	65	+61	12	Advanced to Semifinals
2	Indonesia	6	5	1	120	76	+44	11	Advanced to Semifinals
3	Vietnam (H)	6	4	2	118	89	+29	10	Advanced to Semifinals
4	Philippines	6	3	3	98	93	+5	9	Advanced to Semifinals
5	Malaysia	6	2	4	85	92	−7	8	
6	Singapore	6	1	5	68	111	−43	7	
7	Cambodia	6	0	6	29	127	−98	6	

Updated to match(es) played on unknown. Source: 2021 SEA GAMES
Rules for classification: 1) Points; 2) Head-to-head results; 3) Points for;
(H) Hosts

13 May 2022
10:40

Indonesia	19–18	Vietnam

Thanh Tri Gymnasium

13 May 2022
13:00

Indonesia	17–20	Thailand

Thanh Tri Gymnasium

13 May 2022
14:40

Indonesia	21–8	Singapore

Thanh Tri Gymnasium

14 May 2022
09:00

Malaysia	11–21	Indonesia

Thanh Tri Gymnasium

14 May 2022
11:20

Philippines	12–21	Indonesia

Thanh Tri Gymnasium

14 May 2022
13:40

Cambodia	7–21	Indonesia

Thanh Tri Gymnasium

Semifinal

14 May 2022
15:41

Indonesia	16–19	Vietnam

Thanh Tri Gymnasium

Bronze medal match

14 May 2022
16:50

Philippines	10–16	Indonesia

Thanh Tri Gymnasium

== Boxing ==
Athlete	Event	Preliminaries	Quarterfinals	Semifinals	Final	
Athlete	Event	Opposition Result	Opposition Result	Opposition Result	Opposition Result	Rank
Kornelis Kwangu Langu	Men's flyweight	—N/a	Trần Văn Thảo (VIE); L 0–5	Did not advance		
Farrand Papendang	Men's lightweight	—N/a	Ye Naing (MYA); W 5–0	James Palicte (PHI); W 3–0	Somchay Wongsuwan (THA); L 0–5	2nd place, silver medalist(s)
Sarohatua Lumbantobing	Men's welterweight	—N/a	Vy Sophors (CAM); W 5–0	Marjon Piañar (PHI); W 4–1	Bunjong Sinsiri (THA); L 0–5	2nd place, silver medalist(s)
Maikhel Roberrd Muskita	Men's light heavyweight	—N/a	Aung Pyae Phyo (MYA); W 5–0	Trương Đình Hoàng (VIE); W 5–0	Anavat Thongkrathok (THA); W 5–0	1st place, gold medalist(s)
Novita Sinadia	Women's flyweight	—N/a		Irish Magno (PHI); L 5–0	Did not advance	3rd place, bronze medalist(s)
Huswatun Hasanah	Women's lightweight	—N/a		Douangchay Thalengliep (LAO); W 5–0	Trần Thị Linh (VIE); L 0–5	2nd place, silver medalist(s)

== Cycling ==
Mountain

Athlete	Event	Seeding run		Final	
Athlete	Event	Time	Rank	Time	Rank
Andy Prayoga	Men's downhill	—N/a		3:09:35.60	2nd place, silver medalist(s)
Popo Sejati Ariyo	Men's downhill	—N/a		3:15:81.00	4
Tiara Andini Prastika	Women's downhill	—N/a		3:31:53:10	1st place, gold medalist(s)

Road

Athlete	Event	Seeding run		Final	
Athlete	Event	Time	Rank	Time	Rank
Aiman Cahyadi	Men's time trial	—N/a		48:37.903	2nd place, silver medalist(s)
Dealton Paryogo Nurarif	Men's time trial	—N/a		50:49.169	7
Ayustina Delia Priatna	Women's time trial	—N/a		40:08.445	1st place, gold medalist(s)
Dewika Sova Mulya	Women's time trial	—N/a		43:10.851	8

== Esports ==
=== CrossFire ===
Athlete	Event	Quarterfinal		Semifinal		Final	
Athlete	Event	Upper	Lower	Upper	Lower	Final	
Athlete	Event	Opposition Score	Opposition Score	Opposition Score	Opposition Score	Opposition Score	Rank
Derry Alviano; Evan Jordan; Glan Kurniadi; Samuel Santosa; Yudi Kurniawan; Riddho Putra Muharam; Jason Ardian	Team	Philippines (PHI); L 0–2	Laos (LAO); W 2–0	—N/a	Philippines (PHI); L 0–3	Did not advance	3rd place, bronze medalist(s)

=== Free Fire ===
Team Squad

Indonesia (1)

- Richard William Manurung
- Ibnu Nasir Ramdani
- Nur Ivaldi Fajar
- Shahin Taskhir
- Victor Innosensius

Indonesia (2)

- Muhammad Fikri Alief Pratama
- Rahma Satria
- Agus Suparman
- Rafli Aidil Fitrah
- Raihan Maghfur

Group play

Pos	Team	Booyah!	Rank Pts	Kill Pts	Total Pts	Final Result
1	Indonesia (1)	3	113	123	236	Gold medal
2	Indonesia (2)	1	90	108	198	Silver medal
3	Thailand (2)	3	106	78	184	Bronze medal
4	Thailand (1)	4	89	93	182	
5	Vietnam (2) (H)	1	73	65	135	
6	Vietnam (1) (H)	1	74	45	119	
7	Malaysia (2)	0	65	42	107	
8	Malaysia (1)	1	73	31	104	
9	Philippines (2)	0	64	35	99	
10	Philippines (1)	0	51	28	79	

Source: 2021 SEA GAMES
(H) Host

=== Mobile Legends: Bang Bang ===
Athlete	Event	Group stage				Semifinal	Final / BM	
Athlete	Event	Opposition Score	Opposition Score	Opposition Score	Rank	Opposition Score	Opposition Score	Rank
Rivaldi Fatah; Albert Neilsen Iskandar; Ihsan Besari Kusudana; Calvin Winata; Calvin; Gilang; Nicky Fernando	Team	Vietnam (VIE); W 2–0	Singapore (SGP); W 2–0	—N/a	1 Q	Malaysia (MAS); W 2–0	Philippines (PHI); L 1–3	2nd place, silver medalist(s)

=== PUBG Mobile ===
Individual

Athlete	Event	Pts	Rank
Alan Raynold Kumaseh	Individual	102	2nd place, silver medalist(s)
Sharfan Syahman	Individual	75	12
Jason Kurniawan	Individual	60	21
Eksa Rachman Jayanto	Individual	51	33
Genta Effendy	Individual	50	34
Made Bagus Prabaswara	Individual	20	51

Team

Athlete	Event	Qualifier		Finals	
Athlete	Event	Pts	Rank	Pts	Rank
Nizar Lugatio Pratama; Sharfan Syahman; M. Rizqie Habibullah; Eksa Rachman Jayanto; Alan Raynold Kumaseh	Team	17	14 Q	133	6
Febrianto Genta Prakasa; Muhammad Albi; Genta Effendy; Made Bagus Prabaswara; Jason Kurniawan	Team	65	1 Q	163	1st place, gold medalist(s)

== Finswimming ==
=== Men ===
Event	Athlete	Heats		Final	
Event	Athlete	Time	Rank	Time	Rank
100 m bi-fins	Harvey Hubert Marcello Hutasuhut	44.390	1	43.510	1st place, gold medalist(s)
100 m bi-fins	Andityo Panigoro	44.770	2	43.980	3rd place, bronze medalist(s)
50 m surface	Wahyu Anggoro Tamtomo	16.070	1	15.830	2nd place, silver medalist(s)
50 m surface	Muhammad Zidan Arrif Billah	17.060	6	16.720	6
100 m surface	Petrol Apostle Gasoline Kambey	38.420	5	37.930	6
100 m surface	Muhammad Zidan Arrif Billah	37.840	2	37.780	4
4 x 100 m surface	Muhammad Zidan Arrif Billah; Bima Dea Sakti Antono; Petrol Apostle Gasoline Kambey; Dio Novandra Wibawa	—N/a		2:31.060	3rd place, bronze medalist(s)
4 x 200 m surface	Muhammad Zidan Arrif Billah; Bima Dea Sakti Antono; Petrol Apostle Gasoline Kambey; Dio Novandra Wibawa	—N/a		6:03.300	2nd place, silver medalist(s)

=== Women ===
Event	Athlete	Heats		Final	
Event	Athlete	Time	Rank	Time	Rank
100 m bi-fins	Joanita Mutiara Hapsari	52.980	8	51.290	4
100 m bi-fins	Raqiel Az Zahra	No result		Did not advance	
50 m surface	Janis Rosalita Suprianto	18.730	2	18.240	1st place, gold medalist(s)
50 m surface	Vania Elvira Elent Rahmadani	19.300	4	19.240	4
100 m surface	Janis Rosalita Suprianto	41.020	2	40.820	2nd place, silver medalist(s)
100 m surface	Ashifa Helsa Ashuroh	43.360	4	43.370	4
800 m surface	Andhini Muthia Maulida	—N/a		7:28.670	2nd place, silver medalist(s)
800 m surface	Katherina Eda Rahayu	—N/a		7:31.720	3rd place, bronze medalist(s)
4 x 100 m surface	Ashifa Helsa Ashuroh; Vania Elvira Elent Rahmadani; Andhini Muthia Maulida; Janis Rosalita Suprianto	—N/a		2:47.660	2nd place, silver medalist(s)
4 x 200 m surface	Katherina Eda Rahayu; Vania Elvira Elent Rahmadani; Andhini Muthia Maulida; Janis Rosalita Suprianto	—N/a		6:21.080	1st place, gold medalist(s)

=== Mixed ===
Event	Athlete	Heats		Final	
Event	Athlete	Time	Rank	Time	Rank
4 x 100 m bi-fins	Joanita Mutiara Hapsari; Raqiel Az zahra Andityo Panigoro; Harvey Hubert Marcello Hutasuhut	—N/a		3:07.430	2nd place, silver medalist(s)

== Football ==
Indonesia only participated in the men's tournament, sending a total of 20 players in Football and 14 players in Futsal.

=== Football ===
Team	Event	Group stage					Semifinal	Final / BM	
Team	Event	Opposition Score	Opposition Score	Opposition Score	Opposition Score	Rank	Opposition Score	Opposition Score	Rank
Indonesia men's	Men's tournament	Vietnam; L 0–3	Timor-Leste; W 4–1	Philippines; W 4–0	Myanmar; W 3–1	2 Q	Thailand; L 0–1 (a.e.t.)	Malaysia; W 1–1 (4–3) (p)	3rd place, bronze medalist(s)

Team roster
Head coach: (South Korea) Shin Tae-yong

No.	Pos.	Player	Date of birth (age)	Caps	Goals	Club
1	GK	Adi Satryo	7 July 2001 (age 25)		0	(Football Association of Indonesia) Persik Kediri
20	GK	Ernando Ari	27 February 2002 (age 24)		0	(Football Association of Indonesia) Persebaya Surabaya
2	DF	Alfeandra Dewangga	28 June 2001 (age 25)		0	(Football Association of Indonesia) PSIS Semarang
3	DF	Firza Andika	11 May 1999 (age 27)		0	(Football Association of Indonesia) Persija Jakarta
5	DF	Rizky Ridho	21 November 2001 (age 24)		1	(Football Association of Indonesia) Persebaya Surabaya
14	DF	Asnawi Mangkualam (vice-captain)	4 October 1999 (age 26)		0	(Korea Football Association) Ansan Greeners
16	DF	Rio Fahmi	6 October 2001 (age 24)		0	(Football Association of Indonesia) Persija Jakarta
19	DF	Fachruddin Aryanto^{OA} (captain)	19 February 1989 (age 37)		1	(Football Association of Indonesia) Madura United
6	MF	Marc Klok^{OA}	20 April 1993 (age 33)		0	(Football Association of Indonesia) Persib Bandung
7	MF	Marselino Ferdinan	9 September 2004 (age 21)		2	(Football Association of Indonesia) Persebaya Surabaya
8	MF	Witan Sulaeman	8 October 2001 (age 24)		3	(Slovak Football Association) senica
11	MF	Saddil Ramdani	2 January 1999 (age 27)		0	(Football Association of Malaysia) Sabah
13	MF	Rachmat Irianto	3 September 1999 (age 26)		1	(Football Association of Indonesia) Persib Bandung
15	MF	Ricky Kambuaya^{OA}	5 May 1996 (age 30)		0	(Football Association of Indonesia) Persib Bandung
17	MF	Syahrian Abimanyu	25 April 1999 (age 27)		0	(Football Association of Indonesia) Persija Jakarta
9	FW	Ronaldo Kwateh	19 October 2004 (age 21)		1	(Football Association of Indonesia) Madura United
10	FW	Egy Maulana	7 July 2000 (age 26)		3	(Slovak Football Association) senica
12	FW	Muhamad Ridwan	13 June 2000 (age 26)		1	(Football Association of Indonesia) Persik Kediri
18	FW	Irfan Jauhari	31 January 2001 (age 25)		0	(Football Association of Indonesia) Persis Solo

^{OA} Over-aged player

Group play

Pos	Team	Pld	W	D	L	GF	GA	GD	Pts	Qualification
1	Vietnam (H)	4	3	1	0	6	0	+6	10	Advance to Semi-finals
2	Indonesia	4	3	0	1	11	5	+6	9	Advance to Semi-finals
3	Myanmar	4	2	0	2	7	8	−1	6	
4	Philippines	4	1	1	2	6	7	−1	4	
5	Timor-Leste	4	0	0	4	3	13	−10	0	

Updated to match(es) played on 15 May 2022. Source: FIFA
(H) Hosts
6 May 2022
19:00

Vietnam	3–0	Indonesia
Nguyễn Tiến Linh 54'; Đỗ Hùng Dũng 74'; Lê Văn Đô 87'	Report

Việt Trì Stadium, Phú Thọ
Attendance: 16,188
Referee: Choi Hyun-jai (South Korea)
10 May 2022
19:00

Indonesia	4–1	Timor-Leste
Egy 16'; Witan 52', 77'; Fachruddin 59'	Report	Mouzinho 69'

Việt Trì Stadium, Phú Thọ
Attendance: 3,133
Referee: Ammar Ashkanani (Kuwait)
13 May 2022
16:00

Philippines	0–4	Indonesia
	Report	Ridwan 18'; Rizky 44'; Egy 74'; Marselino 85' (pen.)

Việt Trì Stadium, Phú Thọ
Attendance: 2,661
Referee: Mahmood Al-Majarafi (Oman)
15 May 2022
16:00

Indonesia	3–1	Myanmar
Egy 6'; Witan 10'; Marselino 45+2'	Report	Win Naing Tun 67'

Việt Trì Stadium, Phú Thọ
Attendance: 2,519
Referee: Mohammad Arafah (Jordan)

Semifinal

19 May 2022
16:00

Thailand	1–0 (a.e.t.)	Indonesia
Weerathep 95'	Report

Thiên Trường Stadium, Nam Định
Referee: Feras Taweel (Syria)

Bronze medal match

22 May 2022
16:00

Malaysia	1–1	Indonesia
Hadi 81'	Report	Ronaldo 69'
Penalties
Hadi (penalty missed); Hairiey (penalty scored); Luqman (penalty missed); Harith (penalty scored); Mukhairi (penalty scored)	3–4	(penalty missed) Asnawi; (penalty scored) Ridwan; (penalty scored) Marselino; (penalty scored) Saddil; (penalty scored) Klok

Mỹ Đình National Stadium, Hanoi
Referee: Adam Fazeel (Maldives)

=== Futsal ===
Team roster
Head coach: (Iran) Mohammad Hashemzadeh

No.	Pos.	Player	Date of birth (age)	Caps	Goals	Club
1	GK	Muhammad Nizar	17 February 1995 (age 31)			(Football Association of Indonesia) Kancil BBK
13	GK	Muhammad Albagir	13 December 1997 (age 28)			(Football Association of Indonesia) Black Steel
3	DF	Rizki Xavier	15 January 1999 (age 27)			(Football Association of Indonesia) Cosmo JNE
9	DF	Rio Pangestu	30 August 1997 (age 28)			(Football Association of Indonesia) Bintang Timur
14	DF	Marvin Alexa	12 May 1992 (age 34)			(Football Association of Indonesia) Kancil BBK
2	MF	Guntur Sulistyo	20 March 1998 (age 28)			(Football Association of Indonesia) Bintang Timur
4	MF	Iqbal Iskandar	23 August 1995 (age 30)			(Football Association of Indonesia) Bintang Timur
5	MF	Dewa Rizki	16 January 2001 (age 25)			(Football Association of Indonesia) Cosmo JNE
7	MF	Syauqi Saud	29 January 1997 (age 29)			(Football Association of Indonesia) Bintang Timur
8	MF	Ardiansyah Nur (captain)	27 August 1997 (age 28)			(Football Association of Indonesia) Black Steel
11	MF	Firman Adriansyah	9 February 2000 (age 26)			(Football Association of Indonesia) Cosmo JNE
12	MF	Ardiansyah Runtuboy	15 July 1998 (age 28)			(Football Association of Indonesia) Bintang Timur
6	FW	Samuel Eko	16 May 1998 (age 28)			(Football Association of Indonesia) Bintang Timur
10	FW	Evan Soumilena	19 November 1996 (age 29)			(Football Association of Indonesia) Black Steel

Group play

Pos	Team	Pld	W	D	L	GF	GA	GD	Pts	Final Result
1	Thailand	4	3	1	0	11	4	+7	10	Gold medal
2	Indonesia	4	2	2	0	11	2	+9	8	Silver medal
3	Vietnam (H)	4	2	1	1	12	4	+8	7	Bronze medal
4	Myanmar	4	0	1	3	5	16	−11	1	
5	Malaysia	4	0	1	3	7	20	−13	1	

Updated to match(es) played on 18 May 2022. Source:
(H) Hosts
11 May 2021
16:00

Vietnam	1–1	Indonesia
Nguyễn Minh Trí 2'		Syauqi Saud 33'

Hà Nam Gymnasium, Hà Nam
14 May 2021
13:00

Indonesia	6-0	Myanmar
Iqbal 22'; Syauqi 27'; Soumilena 33', 38'; Ardiansyah Nur 34'

Hà Nam Gymnasium, Hà Nam
16 May 2021
13:00

Malaysia	0–3	Indonesia
		Syauqi 17'; Firman 21', 22'

Hà Nam Gymnasium, Hà Nam
18 May 2021
13:00

Indonesia	1–1	Thailand
Ardiansyah R. 23'		Apiwat 23'

Hà Nam Gymnasium, Hà Nam

== Kickboxing ==
Indonesia will be sending a total of 8 Kickboxer, 5 male and 3 female.

Full Contact
Men

Athlete	Event	Quarterfinal	Semifinal	Final	
Athlete	Event	Opposition Score	Opposition Score	Opposition Score	Rank
Salmri Stendra Pattisamallo	–51 kg	Fegcan (PHI); W 3–0	Thimadee (THA); W 2–1	Huynh Van (VIE); L 0–3	2nd place, silver medalist(s)
Brian AF Lawitan	–67 kg	Rodnok (THA); L 1–2	Did not advance		

Women

Athlete	Event	Quarterfinal	Semifinal	Final	
Athlete	Event	Opposition Score	Opposition Score	Opposition Score	Rank
Nadya Nakhoir	–48 kg	—N/a	Thi Hang (VIE); L 0–3	Did not advance	3rd place, bronze medalist(s)
Diandra Ariesta Pieter	–56 kg	—N/a	Thi Nhi (VIE); W 2–1	De Paz (PHI); W 3–0	1st place, gold medalist(s)

Low Kick
Men

Athlete	Event	Quarterfinal	Semifinal	Final	
Athlete	Event	Opposition Score	Opposition Score	Opposition Score	Rank
Bonatua Lumbantungkup	–60 kg	Valsiripattanachai (THA); L 0–3	Did not advance		
Abdul Muis	–63,5 kg	Santidongsakun (THA); L 0–3	Did not advance		
Yermias Yohanes Tanoi	–71 kg	Antonio (PHI); L 0–3	Did not advance		

Women

Athlete	Event	Quarterfinal	Semifinal	Final	
Athlete	Event	Opposition Score	Opposition Score	Opposition Score	Rank
Amanda La Loupatty	–52 kg	Yoysaykham (LAO); W 3–0	Permkhunthod (THA); W 2–1	Decena (PHI); W 3–0	1st place, gold medalist(s)

== Pencak silat ==
seni

Athlete	Event	Elimination rounds	Semifinal	Final	
Athlete	Event	Opposition Score	Opposition Score	Opposition Score	Rank
Asep Yuldan Sani	Men's tunggal	Rahman (SIN); L 9.950–9.960	Did not advance		
Haidir Agung Faletehan; Dedi Setiadi	Men's ganda	Danh Tran / Quan Le (VIE); L 9.895–9.945	Did not advance		
Anggi Faisal Mubarok; Asep Yuldan Sani; Nunu Nugraha	Men's regu	—N/a	Philippines (PHI); W 9.960–9.905	Thailand (THA); L 9.945–9.960	2nd place, silver medalist(s)
Puspa Arumsari	Women's tunggal	Hamzah (MAS); W 9.950–9.990	Salermbubpha (LAO); W 9.965–9.905	Cezar (PHI); L 9.945–9.960	2nd place, silver medalist(s)
Ririn Rinasih; Riska Hermawan	Women's ganda	Benarao / Lagura (PHI); W 9.930–9.900	Ismael Binte / Samsuri Binte (SIN); W 9.915–9.860	Ha Nguyen / Huyen Nguyen (VIE); W 9.955–9.925	1st place, gold medalist(s)
Eny Tri Susilowati; Riva Hijriah; Riana Oktavia	Women's regu	Vietnam (VIE); L 9.935–9.950	Did not advance		

Tanding

Athlete	Event	Quarterfinals	Semifinals	Final	
Athlete	Event	Opposition Result	Opposition Result	Opposition Result	Rank
Khoirudin Mustakim	Men's 50–55 kg	Yazid (SIN); W 3–0	Tuấn (VIE); W 3–0	Azhar (MAS); L 0–3	2nd place, silver medalist(s)
Muhammad Yachser Arafa	Men's 55–60 kg	Catcatan (PHI); W 3–0	Amzad (MAS); W 3–0	Hazim (SIN); L 0–3	2nd place, silver medalist(s)
Hanifan Yudani Kusumah	Men's 60–65 kg	Phuong (VIE); L 0–3	Did not advance		
Iqbal Candra Pratama	Men's 70–75 kg	Jamari (MAS); L 0–3	Did not advance		
I Kadek Adi Budiasta	Men's 75–80 kg	Bunchit (THA); L 0–3	Did not advance		
Ronaldo Neno	Men's 80–85 kg	Bye	Jeffry (SIN); W 3–0	Duy (VIE); L 0–3	2nd place, silver medalist(s)
Firdhana Wahyu Putra	Men's 90–95 kg	Suazo (PHI); W 3–0	Glompan (THA); L 0–3	Did not advance	3rd place, bronze medalist(s)
Tri Juwanda Samsul Bahar	Men's 95–110 kg	—N/a	Le Van (VIE); L 0–3	Did not advance	3rd place, bronze medalist(s)
Selly Andriani	Women's 65–70 kg	Shazwana (MAS); L 0–3	Did not advance		
Rahmawati	Women's 70–75 kg	—N/a	Quang (VIE); L 0–3	Did not advance	3rd place, bronze medalist(s)

== Rowing ==
Men

Athlete	Event	Heats		Final	
Athlete	Event	Time	Rank	Time	Rank
La Memo; Sulfianto	Double sculls	07:12.89	1 FA	07:22.011	1st place, gold medalist(s)
Ardi Isadi; Ihram; Kakan Kusmana; Ali Mardiansyah	Quadruple sculls	06:55.15	2 FA	06:28.399	1st place, gold medalist(s)
Denri Maulidzar Al Ghiffari; Ferdiansyah	Pair	06:44.264	1 FA	06:57.724	1st place, gold medalist(s)
Ihram	Lightweight single sculls	07:08.959	1 FA	07:25.151	1st place, gold medalist(s)
Kakan Kusmana; Ardi Isadi	Lightweight double sculls	06:33.96	3 FA	07:01.385	1st place, gold medalist(s)
Edwin Ginanjar Rudiana; Sulfianto; La Memo; Rifqi Harits Taufiqurrahman	Lightweight quadruple	06:29.984	4 FA	06:08.236	1st place, gold medalist(s)
Denri Maulidzar Al Ghiffari; Ferdiansyah; Ali Buton; Mahendra Yanto	Lightweight coxless four	06:42.37	2 FA	06:47.729	1st place, gold medalist(s)
Jefri Ardianto; Rio Rizki Darmawan	Lightweight pair	06:43.735	2 FA	07:00.841	1st place, gold medalist(s)

Women

Athlete	Event	Heats		Final	
Athlete	Event	Time	Rank	Time	Rank
Nurtang	Single sculls	08:04.661	3 FA	08:42.969	4
Anisa Shopiani; Anggi Widiarti	Double sculls	07:41.879	3 FA	07:45.641	4
Puteri Agni Anugerah; Annisa Meilani Yahya; Maslin Efrilia; Dewi Purwanti	Quadruple sculls	09:08.00	2 FA	07:23.614	2nd place, silver medalist(s)
Syiva Lisdiana; Aisah Nabila; Julianti; Chelsea Corputty	Coxless four	08:04.661	3 FA	07:16.530	2nd place, silver medalist(s)
Julianti; Chelsea Corputty	Pair	08:44.60	3 FA	08:11.551	2nd place, silver medalist(s)
Melani Putri; Mutiara Rahma Putri	Lightweight double sculls	07:29.797	2 FA	07:43.934	2nd place, silver medalist(s)
Mutiara Rahma Putri; Melani Putri; Nurtang; Anggi Widiarti	Lightweight quadruple sculls	07:29.14	2 FA	07:18.388	2nd place, silver medalist(s)
Syiva Lisdiana; Aisah Nabila; Yuniarty; Chelsea Corputty	Lightweight coxless four	08:04.661	3 FA	07:22.504	2nd place, silver medalist(s)

== Volleyball ==
=== Men's tournament ===
Team	Event	Group stage		Semifinals / Pl.	Final / BM / Pl.	
Team	Event	Oppositions Scores	Rank	Opposition Score	Opposition Score	Rank
Indonesia men's	Men's tournament	Myanmar; W 3–0 Vietnam; W 3–1; Malaysia; W 3–0	1 Q	Cambodia; W 3–1	Vietnam; W 3–0	1st place, gold medalist(s)

Roster

Indonesia
- Rendy Febriant Tamamilang
- Sigit Ardian
- Muhammad Malizi
- Daffa Naufal
- Yuda Mardiansyah Putra
- Dimas Saputra
- Rivan Nurmulki
- Irpan
- Farhan Halim
- Dio Zulfikri
- Nizar Julfikar (c)
- Fahreza Rakha
- Doni Haryono

=== Women's tournament ===
Team	Event	Group stage		Semifinals / Pl.	Final / BM / Pl.	
Team	Event	Oppositions Scores	Rank	Opposition Score	Opposition Score	Rank
Indonesia women's	Women's tournament	Vietnam; L 1–3 Malaysia; W 3–0; Thailand; L 0–3; Philippines; W 3–1	3	—N/a	Philippines; W 3–1	3rd place, bronze medalist(s)

Roster

Indonesia
- Nandita Salsabila
- Ratri Wulandari
- Megawati Pertiwi
- Yolana Pangestika
- Amalia Nabila (c)
- Tisya Putri
- Arsela Purnama
- Shintia Mauludina
- Dita Azizah
- Yolla Yuliana
- Wilda Nurfadhilah
- Shella Onnan

== Weightlifting ==
Men

Athlete	Event	Snatch		Clean & jerk		Total	Rank
Athlete	Event	Result	Rank	Result	Rank	Total	Rank
Satrio Adi Nugroho	−55 kg	110	4	140	4	250	4
Eko Yuli Irawan	−61 kg	135	1	155	2	290	1st place, gold medalist(s)
Mohammad Yasin	−67 kg	141	1	167	2	308	2nd place, silver medalist(s)
Rahmat Erwin Abdullah	−73 kg	155; GR	1	190; GR	1	345; GR	1st place, gold medalist(s)
Rizki Juniansyah	−81 kg	157; GR	1	197	2	354	2nd place, silver medalist(s)
Muhammad Zul Ilmi	−89 kg	150	1	187	1	337	1st place, gold medalist(s)

Women

Athlete	Event	Snatch		Clean & jerk		Total	Rank
Athlete	Event	Result	Rank	Result	Rank	Total	Rank
Siti Nafisatul Hariroh	−45 kg	72	3	90	3	162	3rd place, bronze medalist(s)
Windy Cantika Aisah	−49 kg	86	2	~~100~~	—	86	DNF
Natasya Beteyob	−55 kg	84	3	104	3	188	3rd place, bronze medalist(s)
Sarah	−59 kg	~~85~~	DNF	—	—	—	DNF
Tsabitha Alfiah Ramadani	−64 kg	100	3	116	4	216	3rd place, bronze medalist(s)
Restu Anggi	−71 kg	92	4	120	3	212	3rd place, bronze medalist(s)
Nurul Akmal	+71 kg	110	3	142	2	252	2nd place, silver medalist(s)

== Wushu ==
Taolu

Athlete	Event	Event 1		Event 2		Total	Rank
Athlete	Event	Result	Rank	Result	Rank	Total	Rank
Edgar Xavier Marvelo	Men's changquan	9.46	6	—N/a		9.46	6
Edgar Xavier Marvelo	Men's daoshu and gunshu	9.71	2	9.44	8	19.15	5
Seraf Naro Siregar	Men's changquan	9.69	3	—N/a		9.69	3rd place, bronze medalist(s)
Seraf Naro Siregar	Men's daoshu and gunshu	9.71	1	9.71	1	19.42	1st place, gold medalist(s)
Harris Horatius	Men's nandao	9.52	7	—N/a		9.52	7
Harris Horatius	Men's nanquan	9.70	2	—N/a		9.70	2nd place, silver medalist(s)
Harris Horatius	Men's nangun	9.69	3	—N/a		9.69	3rd place, bronze medalist(s)
Nicholas	Men's taijiquan	9.48	5	—N/a		9.48	5
Nicholas	Men's taijijian	9.71	2	—N/a		9.71	2nd place, silver medalist(s)
Nandhira Mauriskha	Women's jianshu	9.67	2	—N/a		9.67	2nd place, silver medalist(s)
Nandhira Mauriskha	Women's qiangshu	9.68	4	—N/a		9.68	4
Nandhira Mauriskha	Women's changquan	9.70	2	—N/a		9.70	2nd place, silver medalist(s)
Zoura Nebulani	Women's jianshu	9.65	4	—N/a		9.65	4
Zoura Nebulani	Women's qiangshu	9.58	7	—N/a		9.58	7
Zoura Nebulani	Women's changquan	9.59	4	—N/a		9.59	4
Eugenia Diva Widodo	Women's daoshu and gunshu	9.70	2	9.27	6	18.97	6
Alisya Mellynar	Women's taijiquan	9.71	1	—N/a		9.71	1st place, gold medalist(s)
Alisya Mellynar	Women's taijijian	9.52	8	—N/a		9.52	8

Sanda

Athlete	Event	Quarterfinal	Semifinal	Final	
Athlete	Event	Opposition Score	Opposition Score	Opposition Score	Rank
Laksamana Pandu Pratama	Men's –56 kg	Singhalamdee (LAO); W 2–0	Sametprampekeo (CAM); W 1–0	Mandal Roa (PHI); L 0–2	2nd place, silver medalist(s)
Jumanta	Men's –60 kg	Linn (MYA); W 2–0	Muychantharith (CAM); W 1–0	Giang Bui (VIE); L 0–2	2nd place, silver medalist(s)
Abdul Haris Sofyan	Men's –65 kg	Solis Alo (PHI); L 0–2	Did not advance		
Puja Riyaya	Men's –70 kg	Saibounpheng (LAO); W 2–0	Minh Htet (MYA); W 2–0	Van Tai (VIE); L 0–2	2nd place, silver medalist(s)
Jumanita Malau	Women's –48 kg	—N/a	Manoban (THA); W 2–0	Thi Chinh (VIE); WO	1st place, gold medalist(s)
Rosalina Simanjuntak	Women's –52 kg	Chamnanjit (THA); W 2–0	Chamnanjit (THA); W 2–0	Nga Ngo (VIE); L 0–2	2nd place, silver medalist(s)
Melisa Try Andani	Women's –56 kg	—N/a	Oupaxa (LAO); W 1–0	Tuy Nguyen (LAO); L 0–1	2nd place, silver medalist(s)
Thania Kusumaningtyas	Women's –60 kg	—N/a	Trang (VIE); L 0–2	Did not advance	3rd place, bronze medalist(s)
