= Cycling at the 2021 SEA Games – Men's cross country =

Cycling – Men's cross country at the 2021 SEA Games
- Venue: Hoa Binh Gymnastics and Sports Center
- Dates: 16 May 2022
- Competitors: 18 from 7 nations

Medalists
gold medal	Zaenal Fanani; Indonesia
silver medal	Ihza Muhammad; Indonesia
bronze medal	Jerico Rivera Cruz; Philippines

The men's cross country mountain biking cycling event at the 2021 SEA Games took place on 16 May 2022, at the Hoa Binh Gymnastics and Sports Center in Hòa Bình. 18 riders from 7 different nations competed in the event.

== Results ==
Rank	Rider	Nationality	Time
1st place, gold medalist(s)	Zaenal Fanani	Indonesia	1:16:41.00
2nd place, silver medalist(s)	Ihza Muhammad	Indonesia	1:19:14.00
3rd place, bronze medalist(s)	Jerico Rivera Cruz	Philippines	1:20:04.00
4	Keerati Sukprasart	Thailand	1:20:17.00
5	Chhan Chhayfong	Cambodia	1:21:24.00
6	Huot Loyraksmey	Cambodia	1:22:32.00
7	Edmhel John Flores Rivera	Philippines	1:24:04.00
8	Ahmad Syazrin Awang Ilah	Malaysia	1:24:74.00
9	Seyha Sang	Cambodia	1:25:05.00
10	Adisak Tailangkha	Thailand	1:27:01.00
11	Mark Louwel Valderama Antonio	Philippines	1:27:20.00
12	Muaz Abd Rahim	Malaysia	1:27:27.00
13	Văn Hiếu Bùi	Vietnam	1:27:30.00
14	Riyadh Hakim Lukman	Singapore	1:27:41.00
15	Phunsiri Sirimongkhon	Thailand	1:31:31.00
16	Minh Gia Bao Vo	Vietnam	1:31:32.00
17	Hữu Sang Nguyễn	Vietnam	1:33:24.00
-	Zulfikri	Malaysia	No Result
