= Taekwondo at the 2021 SEA Games =

- Venue: Tây Hồ District Sporting Hall
- Location: Hanoi, Vietnam
- Dates: 16–19 May 2022

Taekwondo competitions at the 2021 SEA Games took place at Tây Hồ District Sporting Hall in Hanoi, Vietnam from 16 to 19 May 2022.

== Medal table ==
* Host nation (Vietnam)

Rank	Nation	Gold	Silver	Bronze	Total
1	Vietnam*	8	5	3	16
2	Thailand	5	4	3	12
3	Philippines	2	5	3	10
4	Indonesia	1	2	9	12
5	Cambodia	1	1	3	5
5	Malaysia	1	1	3	5
7	Singapore	1	0	3	4
8	Myanmar	0	1	3	4
9	Laos	0	0	4	4
10	Timor-Leste	0	0	1	1
Totals (10 entries)		19	19	35	73

== Medalists ==
=== Poomsae ===
Event	Gold	Silver	Bronze
Men's recognized	Phạm Quốc Việt; Vietnam	Jason Loo Jun Wei; Malaysia	Sippakorn Wetchakornpatiwong; Thailand
Men's recognized	Phạm Quốc Việt; Vietnam	Jason Loo Jun Wei; Malaysia	Muhammad Alfi Kusuma; Indonesia
Women's recognized	Jocel Lyn Ninobla; Philippines	Lê Trần Kim Uyên; Vietnam	Defia Rosmaniar; Indonesia
Women's recognized	Jocel Lyn Ninobla; Philippines	Lê Trần Kim Uyên; Vietnam	Ornawee Srisahakit; Thailand
Men's recognized team	Vietnam; Trần Hồ Duy; Nguyễn Thiên Phụng; Nguyễn Đình Khôi	Philippines; Patrick King Perez; Raphael Enrico Mella; Rodolfo Reyes Jr.	Indonesia; Muhammad Rizal; Muhammad Hafizh Fachrur Rhozy; Muhammad Alfi Kusuma
Men's recognized team	Vietnam; Trần Hồ Duy; Nguyễn Thiên Phụng; Nguyễn Đình Khôi	Philippines; Patrick King Perez; Raphael Enrico Mella; Rodolfo Reyes Jr.	Singapore; Brandon Low; Darren Yap; Dixon Ho
Women's recognized team	Vietnam; Nguyễn Thị Kim Hà; Ngô Thị Thùy Dung; Nguyễn Thị Hồng Trang	Thailand; Ornawee Srisahakit; Pichamon Limpaiboon; Phenkanya Phaisankiattikun	Malaysia; Lim Jia Wei; Nur Humaira Abdul Karim; Nurul Hidayah Abdul Karim
Women's recognized team	Vietnam; Nguyễn Thị Kim Hà; Ngô Thị Thùy Dung; Nguyễn Thị Hồng Trang	Thailand; Ornawee Srisahakit; Pichamon Limpaiboon; Phenkanya Phaisankiattikun	Laos; Yotthida Kenphokham; Mechi Vongsa; Bouasavanh Phongsavath
Mixed freestyle team	Vietnam; Châu Tuyết Vân; Hứa Văn Huy; Nguyễn Ngọc Minh Hy; Nguyễn Thị Lệ Kim; Trần Đăng Khoa	Philippines; Juvenile Faye Crisostomo; Justin Kobe Macario; Jeordan Dominguez; Darius Venerable; Janna Dominique Oliva	Laos; Lukkee Sengmanee; Latthachak Philavanh; Soulasak Siphanya; Azern Lathvongxay; Kidavone Philavong

=== Men's kyorugi ===
Event	Gold	Silver	Bronze
Finweight; 54 kg	Kurt Bryan Barbosa; Philippines	Panachai Jaijulla; Thailand	Reinaldy Atmanegara; Indonesia
Finweight; 54 kg	Kurt Bryan Barbosa; Philippines	Panachai Jaijulla; Thailand	Sebastian Tan Chung Wan; Malaysia
Flyweight; 58 kg	Thanakrit Yodrak; Thailand	Youdeth Sam; Cambodia	Phouvilay Yommalath; Laos
Flyweight; 58 kg	Thanakrit Yodrak; Thailand	Youdeth Sam; Cambodia	Phạm Đăng Quang; Vietnam
Bantamweight; 63 kg	Muhammad Bassam Raihan; Indonesia	Ngô Quang Tiến; Vietnam	Zaw Lin Htet; Myanmar
Bantamweight; 63 kg	Muhammad Bassam Raihan; Indonesia	Ngô Quang Tiến; Vietnam	Tawin Hanprab; Thailand
Featherweight; 68 kg	Chaichon Cho; Thailand	Lý Hồng Phúc; Vietnam	Chunn Soklong; Cambodia
Featherweight; 68 kg	Chaichon Cho; Thailand	Lý Hồng Phúc; Vietnam	Ahmad Nor Iman Hakim; Malaysia
Lightweight; 74 kg	Mithona Va; Cambodia	Dave Cea Cuenca; Philippines	Osanando Naufal Khairudin; Indonesia
Lightweight; 74 kg	Mithona Va; Cambodia	Dave Cea Cuenca; Philippines	Lê Minh Vương; Vietnam
Welterweight; 80 kg	Muhammad Syafiq Zuber; Malaysia	Phạm Minh Bảo Kha; Vietnam	Htet Zaw Lin; Myanmar
Welterweight; 80 kg	Muhammad Syafiq Zuber; Malaysia	Phạm Minh Bảo Kha; Vietnam	Samuel Morrison; Philippines
Heavyweight +87 kg	Athi Sararat; Thailand	Nicholas Armanto; Indonesia	Kyaw Min Nang; Myanmar
Heavyweight +87 kg	Athi Sararat; Thailand	Nicholas Armanto; Indonesia	Israel Cesar Cantos Lamboloto; Philippines

=== Women's kyorugi ===
Event	Gold	Silver	Bronze
Finweight; 46 kg	Trương Thị Kim Tuyền; Vietnam	Chutikan Jongkolrattanawattana; Thailand	Ni Kadek Heni Prikasih; Indonesia
Finweight; 46 kg	Trương Thị Kim Tuyền; Vietnam	Chutikan Jongkolrattanawattana; Thailand	Isabel Felipa Rivas; Singapore
Flyweight; 49 kg	Panipak Wongpattanakit; Thailand	Dhaysi Oo Julius; Myanmar	Santina Adelaide de Dousa Fernandez; Timor-Leste
Flyweight; 49 kg	Panipak Wongpattanakit; Thailand	Dhaysi Oo Julius; Myanmar	Vũ Thị Dung; Vietnam
Bantamweight; 53 kg	Trần Thị Ánh Tuyết; Vietnam	Baby Jessica Canabal Noveno; Philippines	Megawati Tamesti Maheswari; Indonesia
Bantamweight; 53 kg	Trần Thị Ánh Tuyết; Vietnam	Baby Jessica Canabal Noveno; Philippines	Nichelle Ying Xuan Tan; Singapore
Featherweight; 57 kg	Phannapa Harnsujin; Thailand	Phạm Ngọc Châm; Vietnam	Aliza Chhoeung; Cambodia
Featherweight; 57 kg	Phannapa Harnsujin; Thailand	Phạm Ngọc Châm; Vietnam	Mariska Halinda; Indonesia
Lightweight; 62 kg	Phạm Thị Thu Hiền; Vietnam	Sasikarn Tongchan; Thailand	Casandre Nicole Tubbs; Cambodia
Lightweight; 62 kg	Phạm Thị Thu Hiền; Vietnam	Sasikarn Tongchan; Thailand	Dinda Putri Lestari; Indonesia
Welterweight; 67 kg	Bạc Thị Khiêm; Vietnam	Silvana Amanda; Indonesia	Laila Delo Rimbawa; Philippines
Heavyweight +73 kg	Nguyễn Thị Hương; Vietnam	Kirstie Alora; Philippines	Thidasavanh Sotthachit; Laos
