= Rowing at the 2021 SEA Games =

- Venue: Thủy Nguyên Boat Racing Center
- Location: Hải Phòng, Vietnam
- Dates: 9–14 May 2022

Rowing events at the 2021 SEA Games took place at Thủy Nguyên Boat Racing Center, in Hải Phòng, Vietnam from 9 to 14 May 2022.

== Medal table ==
* Host nation (Vietnam)

Rank	Nation	Gold	Silver	Bronze	Total
1	Vietnam*	8	6	2	16
2	Indonesia	8	6	0	14
3	Philippines	0	2	6	8
4	Thailand	0	2	5	7
5	Myanmar	0	0	3	3
6	Cambodia	0	0	1	1
Totals (6 entries)		16	16	17	49

== Medalists ==
=== Men ===
Two bronze medals were awarded in men's double sculls event as two teams crossed the finish line at the exact same time.

Event	Gold	Silver	Bronze
Double sculls	Indonesia; La Memo; Sullfianto	Thailand; Chanin Penthongdee; Prem Nampratueng	Vietnam; Nguyễn Văn Hiếu; Nguyễn Văn Hà
Double sculls	Indonesia; La Memo; Sullfianto	Thailand; Chanin Penthongdee; Prem Nampratueng	Cambodia; Chov Somrach; Phorn Sophean
Quadruple sculls	Indonesia; Edwin Ginanjar Rudiana; Sulfianto; Rifqi Taufiqurrahman; La Memo	Vietnam; Nguyễn Văn Hiếu; Nguyễn Văn Hà; Nguyễn Văn Tuấn; Nhữ Đình Nam	Thailand; Chanin Penthongdee; Adisorn Phuphuak; Prem Nampratueng; Thanaporn Ta-on
Lightweight single sculls	Ihram; Indonesia	Bùi Văn Hoàn; Vietnam	Cris Nievarez; Philippines
Lightweight doubles sculls	Indonesia; Ardi Isadi; Kakan Kusuma	Philippines; Cris Nievarez; Christian Joseph Jasmin	Vietnam; Bùi Văn Hoàn; Nhữ Đình Nam
Lightweight quadruple sculls	Indonesia; Ardi Isadi; Ihram; Kakan Kusmana; Ali Mardiansyah	Vietnam; Nguyễn Văn Hà; Nguyễn Văn Tuấn; Nhữ Đình Nam; Bùi Văn Hoàn	Philippines; Athens Greece Tolentino; Van Adrian Maxilom; Christian Joseph Jasmin; Emmanuel Joseph Obaña
Lightweight coxless four	Indonesia; Denri Maulidzar Al Ghiffari; Ferdiansyah; Ali Buton; Mahendra Yanto	Vietnam; Vũ Ngọc Khánh; Hoàng Văn Đạt; Võ Như Sang; Phạm Chung	Philippines; Edgar Ilas; Roque Abala Jr; Zuriel Sumintac; Joachim De Jesus
Pair	Indonesia; Denri Maulidzar Al Ghiffari; Ferdiansyah	Vietnam; Trần Dương Nghĩa; Phan Mạnh Linh	Thailand; Nuttapong Sangpromcharee; Dechkajon Yaphonha
Lightweight pair	Indonesia; Jefri Ardianto Suwarno; Rio Riski Darmawan	Vietnam; Vũ Ngọc Khánh; Phạm Chung	Philippines; Edgar Ilas Recaña; Zuriel Sumintac Gumi-as

=== Women ===
Event	Gold	Silver	Bronze
Single sculls	Phạm Thị Huệ; Vietnam	Joanie Delgaco; Philippines	Nuntida Krajangjam; Thailand
Double sculls	Vietnam; Nguyễn Thị Giang; Phạm Thị Thảo	Thailand; Raruen Matinee; Chaempudsa Parisa	Myanmar; Shwe Zin Latt; Nilar Win
Quadruple sculls	Vietnam; Hồ Thị Lý; Phạm Thị Thảo; Phạm Thị Huệ; Đinh Thị Hảo	Indonesia; Putri Agni Anugerah; Annisa Meilani Yahya; Maslin Efrilia; Dewi Purwanti	Philippines; Joanie Delgaco; Amelyn Pagulayan; Josephine Mireille Qua; Kristine Paraon
Coxless four	Vietnam; Phạm Thị Ngọc Anh; Lê Thị Hiền; Hà Thị Vui; Dư Thị Bông	Indonesia; Syiva Lisdiana; Aisah Nabila; Julianti; Chelsea Corputty	Thailand; Matinee Raruen; Parisa Chaempudsa; Jirakit Phuetthonglang; Nuntida Krajangjam
Lightweight doubles sculls	Vietnam; Đinh Thị Hảo; Lường Thị Thảo	Indonesia; Mutiara Rahma Putri; Melani Putri	Thailand; Rawiwan Sukkaew; Jirakit Phuetthonglang
Lightweight quadruple sculls	Vietnam; Nguyễn Thị Giang; Hồ Thị Lý; Phạm Thị Thảo; Lường Thị Thảo	Indonesia; Mutiara Rahma Putri; Melani Putri; Nurtang; Anggi Widiarti	Philippines; Joanie Delgaco; Kharl Julianne Sha; Feiza Jane Lenton; Alyssa Hannah Marciana Go
Lightweight coxless four	Vietnam; Phạm Thị Ngọc Anh; Lê Thị Hiền; Hà Thị Vui; Dư Thị Bông	Indonesia; Chelsea Corputty; Syiva Lisdiana; Aisah Nabila; Yuniarty	Myanmar; Ei Phyu; Sandar Shwe; Chit Phoo Ngon; Win Thuzar Thein
Pair	Vietnam; Đinh Thị Hảo; Phạm Thị Huệ	Indonesia; Julianti; Chelsea Corputty	Myanmar; Shwe Zin Latt; Nilar Win
