= Esports at the 2021 SEA Games =

Hanoi esports contest

- Venue: National Convention Center
- Location: Hanoi, Vietnam
- Dates: 13–22 May 2022

Esports at the 2021 SEA Games took place at National Convention Center in Hanoi, Vietnam from 13 to 22 May 2022. It will be the second esports contest as a medal event in a multi-sport competition sanctioned by the International Olympic Committee.

Ten medals are contested in esports which consists of eight games and ten events. There are two games where two events are matched, League of Legends: Wild Rift will contest men's and women's team and PlayerUnknown's Battlegrounds Mobile will contest individual and team matches. The games are accredited by the Vietnam Recreational and Electronic Sports Association.

Regulations on age restriction stipulates that players should be at least 18 years old. In the previous edition, players at least 12 years old were eligible to compete.

== Medal table ==
* Host nation (Vietnam)

| Rank | Nation | Gold | Silver | Bronze | Total |
|---|---|---|---|---|---|
| 1 | Vietnam* | 4 | 3 | 0 | 7 |
| 2 | Indonesia | 2 | 3 | 1 | 6 |
| 3 | Philippines | 2 | 2 | 0 | 4 |
| 4 | Thailand | 2 | 1 | 3 | 6 |
| 5 | Singapore | 0 | 1 | 3 | 4 |
| 6 | Malaysia | 0 | 0 | 3 | 3 |
| Totals (6 entries) | | 10 | 10 | 10 | 30 |

== Medal summary ==
=== PC ===
| Event | Gold | Silver | Bronze |
|---|---|---|---|
| League of Legends | Vietnam; Trần Duy Sang; Đỗ Duy Khánh; Đặng Thanh Phê; Mai Hoàng Sơn; Võ Thanh Tùng; Trần Đức Hiếu | Philippines; Andre Dominique Soriano; David Emmanuel Tapang; Jan Edward Hortizuela; Hezro Elijah Canlas; Jan Raphael Retance | Singapore; Lee Chen Ming; Dominic Loh; Teo Jia Xiang; Timothy Lim Chin Kiat; Wayne Aw; Mervyn Yee Xuan Wen |
| FIFA Online 4 | Thailand; Teedech Songsaisakul; Phatanasak Varanan; Sorawit Rojjanasinlapin; Saravut Jaima | Vietnam; Nguyễn Hoàng Hiệp; Trần Minh Quang; Lê Huy Hải; Nguyễn Lê Thanh Tòng | Malaysia; Darren Gan; Muhammad Asyraf Kamal; Muhammad Luqman Haziq Hajiman; Wan Muhammad Hakimm Wan Narizan |
| Crossfire | Vietnam; Lê Văn Sơn; Bùi Đình Văn; Mai Thanh Phong; Văn Phú Duy; Đàm Việt Hưng; Lương Đức Tuấn | Philippines; Matthew Arnaez; Dennis Ramos Jr. John Kenneth Alde; Christian Amores; Aldrin Paul Borabon; Arthur Tecson | Indonesia; Derry Alviano; Evan Jordan; Gian Kurnadi; Samuel Santosa; Yudi Kurniawan; Riddho Putra Muharram; Jason Ardian |

=== Mobile ===
| Event | Gold | Silver | Bronze |
|---|---|---|---|
| League of Legends: Wild Rift (men's team) | Vietnam; Nguyễn Chí Khanh; Nguyễn Hữu Phát; Phạm Quốc Bình; Đỗ Thành Đạt; Nguyễn Minh Trí; Phạm Quốc Thắng | Thailand; Metis Wongchoosee; Prasittichai Jiadchat; Nutchanon Yailuang; Jirapat Khawmee; Soragit Buranathanasin; Nuttapong Menkasikan; Juckkirsts Kongubon | Singapore; Alex Tan Yew Ming; Tan Yee Khai; Chua Wee Kiat; Kenneth Goh; Wong Jing Kai; Lim Wyi Shawn; Lam Wei Hao Jervis |
| League of Legends: Wild Rift (women's team) | Philippines; Charize Doble; Giana Llanes; Angel Lozada; Christine Natividad; Rose Ann Robles; April Sotto | Singapore; Ming Yan Wong; Yun Qin Chua; Valerie Ser Lee Seng; Jeslyn Si Hui Kweh; Shasha Xiang | Thailand; Karnsinee Thanarthippiyapat; Pemika Rahmani Tarani; Preeyawan Phuttachat; Kanokpon Parnpim; Thitima Namsiripongpan |
| Arena of Valor | Thailand; Thana Somboonprom; Peerawat Piachart; Pakkapon Saethong; Pasu Yensabai; Eikapong Korhonen; Sanpett Marat; Sorawichaya Mahavanakul | Vietnam; Lý Vương Thuyên; Thóng Lai Bâng; Lương Hoàng Phúc; Phạm Vũ Hoài Nam; Đinh Tấn Khoa; Nguyễn Công Vinh; Nguyễn Thanh Lâm | Malaysia; Shee Ji Hong; Loo Yong Leong; Lai Chia-Chien; Cheo Yong Chen; Cheng Wei Han |
| PUBG Mobile (individual) | Phan Văn Đông; Vietnam | Alan Raynold Kumaseh; Indonesia | Purin Rongkhankaew; Thailand |
| PUBG Mobile (team) | Indonesia; Febrianto Genta Prakasa; Muhammad Albi; Genta Effendy; Made Bagus Prabaswara; Jason Kurniawan | Vietnam; Đinh Dương Thành; Vũ Hoàng Hưng; Mạc Anh Hào; Chu Trung Đức; Phan Văn Đông | Malaysia; Muhamad Izzrudin Hashim; Muhammad Farish Husaini Zailani; Muhammad Irfan Jafni Mohamad; Mohamad Amizul Hafiz Mohd Fadzli |
| Garena Free Fire | Indonesia; Shahin Taskhir; Nur Ivaldi Fajar; Richard William Manurung; Ibnu Nasir Ramdani; Victor Innosensius | Indonesia; Agus Suparman; Rehan Maghfur Al Ghifari; Rhama Satria; Muhammad Fikri Alief Pratama; Rafli Aidil Fitrah | Thailand; Mathina Thaprasert; Anucha Lamphao; Sitta Ngarmchana; Sitthisak Hongkampew; Warawut Penpaitoon |
| Mobile Legends: Bang Bang | Philippines; Kyle Dominic Soto; Danerie Rosario; Salic Imam; Lee Howard Gonzales; Johnmar Villaluna; Dexter Alaba; Aniel Jiandan | Indonesia; Rivaldi Fatah; Albert Neilsen Iskandar; Ihsan Besari Kusudana; Calvin Winata; Calvin; Gilang; Nicky Fernando | Singapore; Stefan Chong Ru Chyi; Remas Ker Zhen Hong; Basil Lim Dao Ze; Adam Chong; Akihiro Furusawa |
