= Esports at the 2021 SEA Games – Mobile Legends tournament =

Esports event at the Southeast Asian Games

Mobile Legends at the 2021 Southeast Asian Games
- Venue: Vietnam National Convention Center
- Dates: 18–20 May 2022
- Nations: 7

Medalists
gold medal	PHI	Philippines
silver medal	INA	Indonesia
bronze medal	SGP	Singapore

The Mobile Legends: Bang Bang tournament for the 2021 Southeast Asian Games was held on May 18 to 20 at the Vietnam National Convention Center in Hanoi, Vietnam. This was the second iteration of the MLBB Tournament in the Southeast Asian Games, the first one being held in 2019.

The tournament consisted of a group stage and a single-elimination playoff round.

== Summary ==
The Philippines were the defending champions. They retained their title after beating Indonesia 3-1 in the final.

== Participating teams ==
- Indonesia (INA)
- Laos (LAO)
- Malaysia (MAS)
- Myanmar (MYA)
- Philippines (PHI)
- Singapore (SGP)
- Vietnam (VIE)

== Results ==
=== Group stage ===
==== Group A ====
Pos	Team	W	D	L	GW	GL	GD	Pts	Qualification
1	Philippines	3	3	0	6	0	+6	9	Semifinals
2	Malaysia	3	2	1	4	2	+4	6	Semifinals
3	Myanmar	3	1	2	2	4	-2	3	
4	Laos	3	0	3	0	6	-6	0	

==== Group B ====
Pos	Team	W	D	L	GW	GL	GD	Pts	Qualification
1	Indonesia	2	2	0	2	0	+4	6	Semifinals
2	Singapore	2	1	1	2	3	0	1	Semifinals
3	Vietnam	2	0	2	1	4	-2	1	

Vietnam and Singapore had the same final result during the Group Stage. During the Semifinals, the Tiebreaker game was held and whoever won the game, will face-off the Philippines. Singapore 1-0 Vietnam.

=== Final round ===
Tiebreaker Game; May 19, 2022
Singapore	1
Vietnam	0

Semifinals; May 19, 2022
Philippines	2
Singapore	1
Indonesia	2
Malaysia	0

Grand Finals; May 20, 2022
Philippines	3
Indonesia	1
Third place
Singapore	2
Malaysia	1

=== Semifinals ===
Team 1	Series	Team 2	Game 1	Game 2	Game 3
Philippines	2–1	Singapore	SGP	PHI	PHI
Indonesia	2-0	Malaysia	INA	INA	

=== Grand Finals ===
Team 1	Series	Team 2	Game 1	Game 2	Game 3	Game 4	Game 5
Philippines	3–1	Indonesia	PHI	INA	PHI	PHI	

=== Bronze-medal match ===
Team 1	Series	Team 2	Game 1	Game 2	Game 3
Malaysia	1-2	Singapore	SGP	MAS	SGP
