= Joanie Delgaco =

Filipino rower (born 1998)

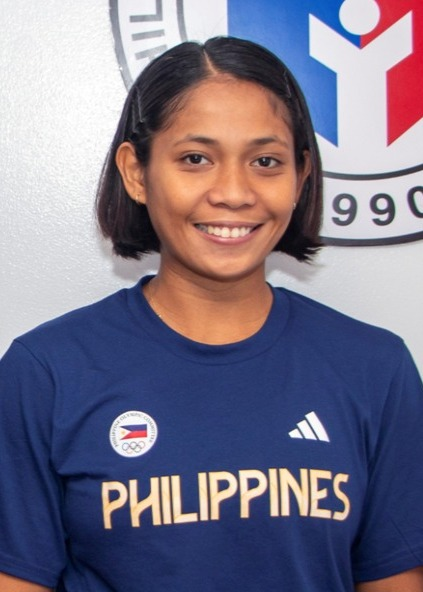
- Delgaco in 2024

Personal information
- Nationality: Filipino
- Born: Joanie Talagtag Delgaco; March 1, 1998 (age 28)
- Home town: Iriga, Camarines Sur, Philippines

Sport
- Country: Philippines
- Sport: Rowing
- Events: Lightweight single sculls, Lightweight double sculls
Medal record
Women's rowing
Representing Philippines
SEA Games
Gold medal – first place	2019 Philippines	Lwt double sculls
Gold medal – first place	2025 Thailand	Double sculls
Silver medal – second place	2021 Hanoi	Single sculls
Silver medal – second place	2025 Thailand	Single sculls
Bronze medal – third place	2021 Hanoi	Quadruple sculls
Bronze medal – third place	2021 Hanoi	Lwt quadruple sculls
Mixed rowing
Representing Philippines
Asian Rowing Beach Sprint Championships
Gold medal – first place	2023 Pattaya	Double sculls

Joanie Talagtag Delgaco (born March 1, 1998) is a Filipino rower who made history as the first female rower from her country to qualify in the 2024 Summer Olympics.

== Career ==
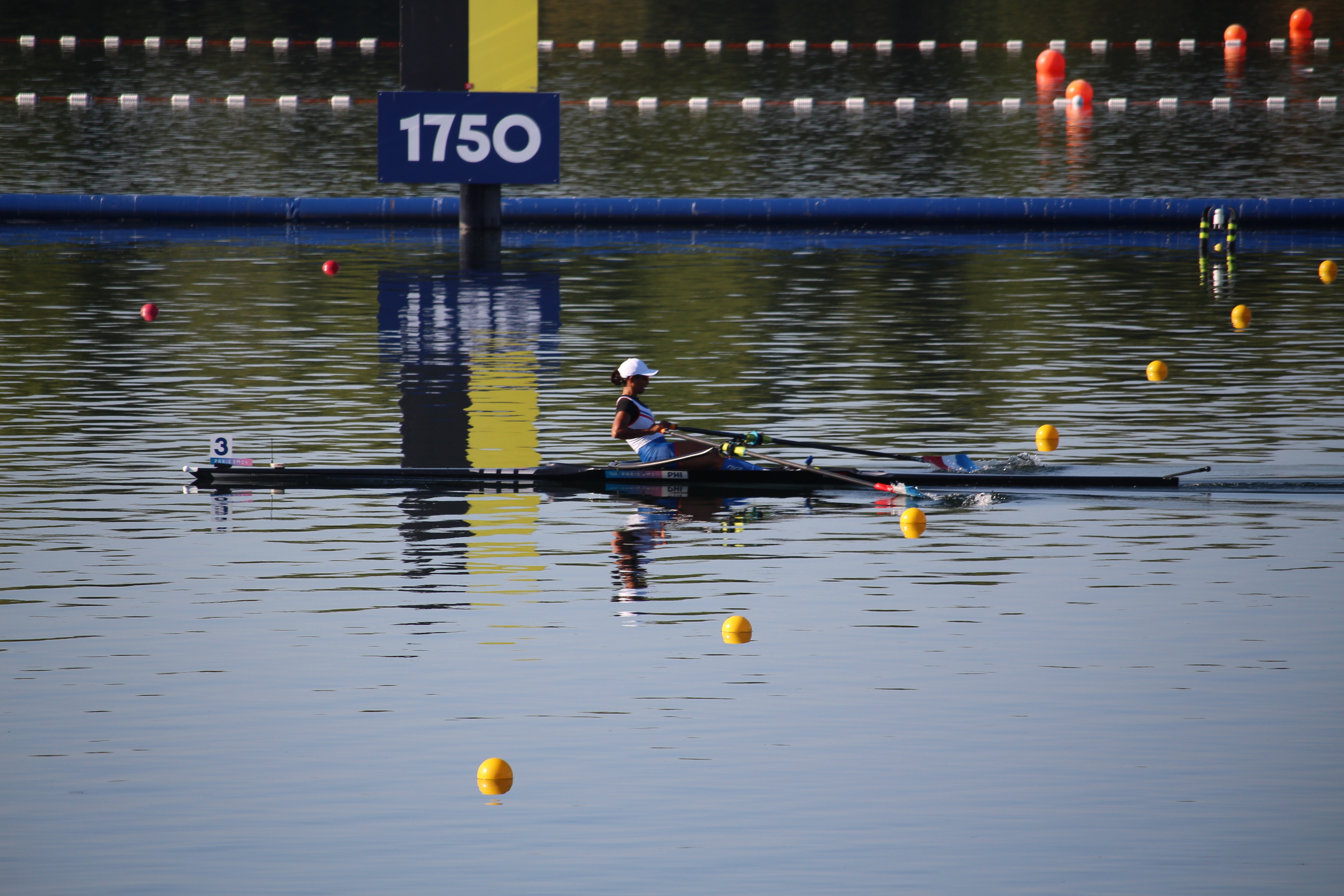
Delgaco at the 2024 Summer Olympics

Delgaco became part of the Philippine national team in 2015.

At the SEA Games she won a gold medal in the 2019 edition hosted in the Philippines, and a silver and two bronzes in the 2021 edition in Vietnam in 2022.

Delgaco qualified for the now-cancelled 2023 World Beach Games in Bali after winning a gold medal in the mixed double sculls with Edgar Ilas at the 2023 Asian Rowing Beach Sprint Championships in Pattaya.

Delgaco took part in the 2022 Asian Games in Hangzhou in 2023. She reached the medal round for the single sculls event but failed to podium.

She qualified for the 2024 Summer Olympics in Paris via the Asian & Oceania Qualification Regatta. She is the first ever female rower to qualify for the Philippines in the Olympics. Delgaco ranked second in the Final D of the women's single sculls and 20th overall at the 2024 Paris Olympics.

After her Paris stint, she received an Olympic Solidarity Scholarship from Fédération Internationale des Sociétés d’Aviron (FISA) Development Head, Daniela Gomes.

For most of the next two years, Delgaco was mostly involved in military training with the Philippine Navy and hence only took part in two competitions in the lead up to the 2025 SEA Games in Thailand. One the competitions was the 2025 Asian Rowing Championships in October in Vietnam.

In December 2025, Delgaco won a gold medal in the women's rowing double sculls in the SEA Games in Thailand.

== Personal life ==
Coming from Iriga, Camarines Sur, she is also an enlisted member of the Philippine Navy.

Prior to rowing she played beach volleyball at the Palarong Pambansa.
