= Shooting at the 2021 SEA Games =

- Venue: Hanoi National Sports Training Centre
- Location: Hanoi, Vietnam
- Dates: 16–22 May 2022

Shooting competitions at the 2021 SEA Games took place at Hanoi National Sports Training Centre in Hanoi, Vietnam from 16 to 22 May 2022.

== Medal table ==
* Host nation (Vietnam)

Rank	Nation	Gold	Silver	Bronze	Total
1	Indonesia	8	6	2	16
2	Vietnam*	7	6	4	17
3	Thailand	3	2	10	15
4	Singapore	2	3	3	8
5	Malaysia	2	2	0	4
6	Myanmar	0	2	0	2
7	Philippines	0	1	1	2
8	Laos	0	0	2	2
Totals (8 entries)		22	22	22	66

== Medalists ==
=== Men ===
Event	Gold	Silver	Bronze
10 m air pistol	Johnathan Wong; Malaysia	Trần Quốc Cường; Vietnam	Muhammad Iqbal Raia Prabowo; Indonesia
10 m air pistol team	Vietnam; Phan Công Minh; Trần Quốc Cường; Phạm Quang Huy	Indonesia; Muhamad Iqbal Raia Prabowo; Deny Pratama; Wira Sukmana	Thailand; Natphanlert Auapinyakul; Peeraphon Chotpaiboonpan; Noppadon Sutiviruch
25 m rapid fire pistol	Hà Minh Thành; Vietnam	Hafiz Adzha; Malaysia	Ram Khamhaeng; Thailand
25 m rapid fire pistol team	Indonesia; Totok Tri Martanto; Dewa Putu Yadi Suteja; Anang Yulianto	Vietnam; Phan Xuân Chuyên; Hà Minh Thành; Đậu Văn Đông	Thailand; Schwakon Triniphakorn; Pornchai Suhkonpanich; Ram Khamhaeng
25 m standard pistol	Anang Yulianto; Indonesia	Swee Hon Lim; Singapore	Phan Xuân Chuyên; Vietnam
50 m pistol	Trần Quốc Cường; Vietnam	Ye Tun Naung; Myanmar	Boriphat Jariyatatkone; Thailand
10 m air rifle	Fathur Gustafian; Indonesia	Lionel Wong Zen Joi; Singapore	Paragra Duncan Taruma Negara; Indonesia
50 m rifle 3 positions	Napis Tortungpanich; Thailand	Fathur Gustafian; Indonesia	Thongphaphum Vongsukdee; Thailand
10 m running target	M. Sejahtera Dwi Putra; Indonesia	Ngô Hữu Vượng; Vietnam	Trần Hoàng Vũ; Vietnam
10 m running target team	Vietnam; Ngô Hữu Vượng; Trần Hoàng Vũ; Nguyễn Tuấn Anh	Indonesia; Muhammad Chuwai Zam; M. Sejahtera Dwi Putra; Irfandi Julio	Laos; Somchanh Xaysommy; Phetdavanh Phetsalat; Parn Douangpaseuth
Trap	Nguyễn Hoàng Điệp; Vietnam	Hagen Alexander Topacio Jao; Philippines	Carlos Carag; Philippines

=== Women ===
Event	Gold	Silver	Bronze
10 m air pistol	Nurul Syasya Nadiah Arifin; Malaysia	Tanyaporn Prucksakorn; Thailand	Trịnh Thu Vinh; Vietnam
10 m air pistol team	Singapore; Teh Xiu Hong; Amanda Sao Keng Mak; Teo Shun Xie	Vietnam; Trịnh Thu Vinh; Bùi Thụy Thu Thủy; Triệu Thị Hoa Hồng	Thailand; Natsara Champalat; Chidchanok Hirunphoem; Tanyaporn Prucksakorn
25 m sports pistol	Teh Xiu Hong; Singapore	Alia Sazana Azahari; Malaysia	Tanyaporn Prucksakorn; Thailand
10 m air rifle	Dewi Laila Mubarokah; Indonesia	Phí Thanh Thảo; Vietnam	Chanittha Sastwej; Thailand
10 m air rifle team	Thailand; Jayden Jitrawee Mohprasit; Thanyalak Chotphibunsin; Chanittha Sastwej	Indonesia; Citra Dewi Resti; Dewi Laila Mubarokah; Monica Daryanti	Singapore; Natanya Tan Huiyi; Fernel Tan Qian Ni; Adele Tan
50 m rifle 3 positions	Phí Thanh Thảo; Vietnam	Ratchadaporn Plengsaengthong; Thailand	Martina Veloso; Singapore
10 m running target	Rica Nensi Perangin Angin; Indonesia	Nourma Try Indriani; Indonesia	Nguyễn Thị Thu Hằng; Vietnam
10 m running target team	Indonesia; Nourma Try Indriani; Nurul Sofiah; Rica Nensi Perangin Angin	Vietnam; Nguyễn Thị Lê; Đặng Hồng Hà; Nguyễn Thị Thu Hằng	Laos; Hongkham Xayyalath; Phoutsady Phommachanh; Khamlar Xayyavong
Trap	Hoàng Thị Tuất; Vietnam	Adylia Safitri; Indonesia	Siti Mastura Rahim; Singapore

=== Mixed ===
Event	Gold	Silver	Bronze
Air pistol team	Thailand; Natphanlert Auapinyakul; Chidchanok Hirunphoem	Myanmar; Chit Soe Nwe; Ye Tun Naung	Thailand; Tanyaporn Prucksakorn; Noppadon Sutiviruch
Air rifle team	Indonesia; Fathur Gustafian; Citra Dewi Resti	Singapore; Gai Tianrui; Fernel Tan Qian Ni	Thailand; Napis Tortungpanich; Chanittha Sastwej
