= Finswimming at the 2021 SEA Games =

Competition at Mỹ Đình Aquatics Center in Hanoi, Vietnam

- Venue: Mỹ Đình Aquatics Center
- Location: Hanoi, Vietnam
- Dates: 21–22 May 2022

Finswimming competitions at the 2021 SEA Games took place at Mỹ Đình Aquatics Center in Hanoi, Vietnam from 21 to 22 May 2022.

== Medal table ==
* Host nation (Vietnam)

Rank	Nation	Gold	Silver	Bronze	Total
1	Vietnam*	10	5	3	18
2	Indonesia	3	6	3	12
3	Thailand	0	2	5	7
4	Cambodia	0	0	1	1
4	Philippines	0	0	1	1
Totals (5 entries)		13	13	13	39

== Medalists ==
=== Men ===
Event	Gold	Silver	Bronze
100 m bi-fins	Harvey Hubert Hutasuhut; Indonesia	Nguyễn Ngọc Huỳnh; Vietnam	Andityo Panigoro; Indonesia
50 m surface	Nguyễn Thành Lộc; Vietnam	Wahyu Anggoro Tamtomo; Indonesia	Khet Chamnanwat; Thailand
100 m surface	Nguyễn Thành Lộc; Vietnam	Đỗ Đình Toàn; Vietnam	Khet Chamnanwat; Thailand
1500 m surface	Kim Anh Kiệt; Vietnam	Paphonpach Wongaek; Thailand	Nguyễn Tiến Đạt; Vietnam
4 × 100 m surface	Vietnam; Đỗ Đình Toàn; Nguyễn Thành Lộc; Lê Đặng Đức Việt; Nguyễn Duy Anh	Thailand; Khet Chamnanwat; Paphonpach Wongaek; Wuthiphat Sa Nguanwong; Katamat Autapao	Indonesia; Bima Dea Sakti Antono; Petrol Apostle Gasoline Kambey; Dio Novandra Wibawa; Wahyu Anggoro Tamtomo
4 × 200 m surface	Vietnam; Đỗ Đình Toàn; Đỗ Thanh Thảo; Đặng Đức Mạnh; Nguyễn Tiến Đạt	Indonesia; Muhammad Zidan Arrif Billah; Bima Dea Sakti Antono; Petrol Apostle Gasoline Kambey; Dio Novandra Wibawa	Cambodia; Chhom Chanthun; Toun Tithsatya; Lim Sokwadthanoon; Lim Keouodom

=== Women ===
Event	Gold	Silver	Bronze
100 m bi-fins	Cao Thị Duyên; Vietnam	Nguyễn Thị Thảo; Vietnam	Nusanee Chandaeng; Thailand
50 m surface	Janis Rosalita Suprianto; Indonesia	Phạm Thị Thu; Vietnam	Nguyễn Thị Thảo; Vietnam
100 m surface	Phạm Thị Thu; Vietnam	Janis Rosalita Suprianto; Indonesia	Nguyễn Thị Hằng; Vietnam
800 m surface	Phạm Thị Kim Thương; Vietnam	Andhini Muthia Maulida; Indonesia	Katherina Eda Rahayu; Indonesia
4 × 100 m surface	Vietnam; Nguyễn Thị Huệ; Nguyễn Thị Hằng; Phạm Thị Thu; Hoàng Thị Tâm	Indonesia; Katherina Eda Rahayu; Ashifa Helsa Ashuroh; Vania Elvira Elent Rahmadani; Andhini Muthia Maulida	Philippines; Romina Rafaelle Gavino; Raissa Regatta Eugenie Gavino; Marjorie Denise Manguiat; Sam Andrei Doragos
4 × 200 m surface	Indonesia; Katherina Eda Rahayu; Vania Elvira Elent Rahmadani; Andhini Muthia Maulida; Janis Rosalita Suprianto	Vietnam; Nguyễn Thị Huệ; Nguyễn Thị Hằng; Trường Hồng Phúc; Phạm Thị Kim Thương	Thailand; Suchaya Vichaksanapong; Nawanit Intharawichien; Kittisook Dumdee; Juthamas Sutthison

=== Mixed ===
Event	Gold	Silver	Bronze
4 × 100 m bi-fins	Vietnam; Phạm Thị Thu; Nguyễn Thị Hằng; Hoàng Thị Tâm; Nguyễn Thị Hằng	Indonesia; Harvey Hubert Hutasuhut; Andityo Panigoro; Joanita Mutiara Hapsari; Raqiel Az Zahra	Thailand; Nusanee Chandaeng; Thewa Baochum; Theerut Yenkongka; Juthamas Sutthison
