= Fathur Gustafian =

Indonesian sports shooter (born 1998)

Personal information
- Nationality: Indonesia
- Born: 21 August 1998 (age 28) Bogor, West Java, Indonesia

Sport
- Country: Indonesia
- Sport: Shooting
- Event: Rifle
- Club: Kartika S.C.
- Coached by: Jung Kiwon; F. Darmawan
Medal record
Men's shooting
Representing Indonesia
ISSF World Cup
Gold medal – first place	2023 Jakarta	50 m rifle 3 positions team
SEA Games
Gold medal – first place	2019 Philippines	10 m air rifle mixed team
Gold medal – first place	2021 Vietnam	10 m air rifle
Gold medal – first place	2021 Vietnam	air rifle mixed team
Silver medal – second place	2021 Vietnam	50 m rifle 3 positions
Silver medal – second place	2019 Philippines	10 m air rifle

Fathur Gustafian (born 21 August 1998) is an Indonesian rifle shooter. He won two gold medal at the 2021 SEA Games in Vietnam. He competed for Indonesia at the 2024 Summer Olympics in the 10 m air rifle and 50 m rifle 3 positions disciplines.
