= Muhamad Ridwan (footballer, born June 2000) =

Indonesian footballer

Personal information
- Full name: Muhamad Ridwan
- Date of birth: 13 June 2000 (age 26)
- Place of birth: Kendal, Indonesia
- Height: 1.84 m (6 ft 0 in)
- Position: Forward

Team information
- Current team: Isenmulang Kalteng
- Number: 9

Youth career
- 2015–2018: SKO Ragunan
- 2016–2017: Persab Brebes

Senior career*
Years	Team	Apps	(Gls)
2018	Sriwijaya	3	(1)
2019	Persela Lamongan	8	(1)
2020	PSIS Semarang	0	(0)
2021–2023	Persik Kediri	19	(1)
2023	→ Dewa United (loan)	4	(0)
2023–2024	Gresik United	7	(1)
2024–2026	Semen Padang	16	(3)
2026	Persikad Depok	3	(0)
2026–	Isenmulang Kalteng	0	(0)

International career^{‡}
2014–2015	Indonesia U16		
2022	Indonesia U23	3	(1)
Medal record
Men's football
Representing Indonesia
Southeast Asian Games
Bronze medal – third place	2021 Vietnam	Team
- * Club domestic league appearances and goals as of 28 February 2026 ‡ National team caps and goals as of 19 May 2022

Muhamad Ridwan (born 13 June 2000) is an Indonesian professional footballer who plays as a forward for Super League club Isenmulang Kalteng.

== Club career ==
=== Sriwijaya ===
He was signed for Sriwijaya to play in Liga 1 in the 2018 season.

=== Persela Lamongan ===
In 2019, Ridwan signed a one-year contract with Indonesian Liga 1 club Persela Lamongan. He made his debut on 22 May 2019 in a match against Persipura Jayapura in the Liga 1. On 22 May 2019, Ridwan scored his first goal for Persela Lamongan against Persipura Jayapura in the 81st minute at the Surajaya Stadium, Lamongan.

=== PSIS Semarang ===
He was signed for PSIS Semarang to play in Liga 1 in the 2020 season. This season was suspended on 27 March 2020 due to the COVID-19 pandemic. The season was abandoned and was declared void on 20 January 2021.

=== Persik Kediri ===
In 2021, Ridwan signed a one-year contract with Indonesian Liga 1 club Persik Kediri. He made his league debut on 28 November 2021 in a match against Persebaya Surabaya at the Manahan Stadium, Surakarta. On 3 December 2021, Ridwan scored his first goal for Persik against Persita Tangerang in the 83rd minute at the Sultan Agung Stadium, Bantul.

==== Loan to Dewa United ====
Muhamad Ridwan became Dewa United's in half of the 2022–23 Liga 1. Ridwan made his debut on 14 January 2023 in a match against Persis Solo at the Indomilk Arena, Tangerang.

== International career ==
Ridwan was part of the Indonesia under-23 team that won Bronze in the 2021 Southeast Asian Games in Vietnam.

== Career statistics ==
=== Club ===
As of match played 28 February 2026

Club	Season	League			Cup		Continental		Other		Total	
Club	Season	Division	Apps	Goals	Apps	Goals	Apps	Goals	Apps	Goals	Apps	Goals
Sriwijaya	2018	Liga 1	3	1	0	0	–		0	0	3	1
Persela Lamongan	2019	Liga 1	8	1	0	0	–		0	0	8	1
PSIS Semarang	2020	Liga 1	0	0	0	0	–		0	0	0	0
Persik Kediri	2021–22	Liga 1	9	1	0	0	–		0	0	9	1
Persik Kediri	2022–23	Liga 1	10	0	0	0	–		1 (Note: Appearances in Indonesia President's Cup)	0	11	0
Persik Kediri	Total		19	1	0	0	–		1	0	20	1
Dewa United (loan)	2022–23	Liga 1	4	0	0	0	–		0	0	4	0
Gresik United	2023–24	Liga 2	7	1	0	0	–		0	0	7	1
Semen Padang	2024–25	Liga 1	7	3	0	0	–		0	0	7	3
Semen Padang	2025–26	Super League	9	0	0	0	–		0	0	9	0
Persikad Depok	2025–26	Championship	3	0	0	0	–		0	0	3	0
Career total			60	7	0	0	0	0	1	0	61	7

=== International goals ===
International under-23 goals

Goal	Date	Venue	Opponent	Score	Result	Competition
1.	13 May 2022	Việt Trì Stadium, Phú Thọ, Vietnam	Philippines	0–1	0–4	2021 Southeast Asian Games

== Honours ==
=== International ===
Indonesia U-23

- SEA Games bronze medal: 2021
