= Melani Putri =

Indonesian rower (born 2000)

Personal information
- Nationality: Indonesian
- Born: 21 July 2000 (age 25) Karawang, Indonesia

Sport
- Sport: Rowing
Medal record
Women's rowing
Representing Indonesia
Event	1st	2nd	3rd
Asian Championships	0	1	1
Southeast Asian Games	0	1	0
Total	0	2	1
Asian Championships
Bronze medal – third place	Thailand 2019	Quadruple sculls
Bronze medal – third place	Thailand 2022	Quadruple sculls
Southeast Asian Games
Silver medal – second place	Vietnam 2021	Lightweight quadruple sculls

Melani Putri (born 21 July 2000) is an Indonesian rower. She competed in the women's lightweight double sculls event at the 2020 Summer Olympics.
