= Cambodia at the 2021 SEA Games =

Cambodia at the 2021 Southeast Asian Games
- IOC code: CAM
- NOC: National Olympic Committee of Cambodia
- Website: www.noccambodia.org (in Khmer and English)

in Hanoi, Vietnam 12–23 May 2022
- Competitors: 542 in 33 sports
- Flag bearer: Jessa Khan (Jujitsu)
- Medals Ranked 8th: Gold 9 Silver 13 Bronze 41 Total 63

Southeast Asian Games appearances (overview)
- 1961; 1965; 1967–1981; 1983; 1985; 1987; 1989–1993; 1995; 1997; 1999; 2001; 2003; 2005; 2007; 2009; 2011; 2013; 2015; 2017; 2019; 2021; 2023; 2025; 2027; 2029

Cambodia participated at the 2021 SEA Games in Hanoi, Vietnam from 12 to 23 May 2022. The Cambodian contingent consisted of 361 athletes, competing in 33 out 40 sports.

== Medal summary ==
=== Medal by sport ===
Medals by sport
Sport	1st place, gold medalist(s)	2nd place, silver medalist(s)	3rd place, bronze medalist(s)	Total	Rank
Vovinam	3	2	9	14	3
Pétanque	2	2	3	7	2
Kickboxing	1	3	1	5	5
Wrestling	1	1	4	6	2
Taekwondo	1	1	3	5	5
Muaythai	1	0	6	7	5
Gymnastics	0	3	1	4	6
Boxing	0	1	3	4	6
Karate	0	0	3	3	7
Wushu	0	0	3	3	9
Rowing	0	0	1	1	7
Jujitsu	0	0	1	1	7
Judo	0	0	1	1	8
Finswimming	0	0	1	1	4
Volleyball	0	0	1	1	5
Total	9	13	41	63	8

=== Medal by date ===
Medals by date
Day	Date	1st place, gold medalist(s)	2nd place, silver medalist(s)	3rd place, bronze medalist(s)	Total
–2	10 May	0	0	1	1
–1	11 May	0	0	1	1
0	12 May	Opening ceremony			
1	13 May	1	3	2	6
2	14 May	0	0	3	3
3	15 May	0	1	2	3
4	16 May	0	0	0	0
5	17 May	1	1	1	3
6	18 May	2	1	4	7
7	19 May	2	3	13	18
8	20 May	1	0	7	8
9	21 May	1	1	6	8
10	22 May	1	3	1	5
Total		9	13	41	63

=== Medalists ===
Medal	Name	Sport	Event	Date
Gold	Racchan Toch	Kickboxing	Men's Full Contact -57kg	13 May
Gold	Vong Sin; Chantha Vrong	Pétanque	Doubles Mixed	17 May
Gold	Mithona Va	Taekwondo	Kyorugi For Male Under 74kg	18 May
Gold	Bunlong Chren; Boramey Ly; Sovanny Prak	Vovinam	Female multiple weapon practice: 1 female defense against 3 others with weapon	18 May
Gold	Bali Sou	Wrestling	Men's freestyle 125 kg	19 May
Gold	Sreya Un; Dina Duong; Sorakhim Sreng	Pétanque	Women's triples	19 May
Gold	Virekkaamchhitphouthong Eh	Vovinam	Men's 65 kg	20 May
Gold	Piseth Chin; Sopheaktra Meth	Vovinam	Male couple weapon practice: Pair machete form	21 May
Gold	Phearith Pao	Muaythai	Men's combat 63.5 kg	22 May
Silver	Meng Hong Kan	Kickboxing	Men's Low kick -54kg	13 May
Silver	Panha Lorn	Kickboxing	Men's Full Contact -67kg	13 May
Silver	Lvay Chhoeung	Kickboxing	Men's Low kick -71kg	13 May
Silver	Chhoeun Thong; Sophorn Yim	Pétanque	Men's Doubles	15 May
Silver	Youdeth Sam	Taekwondo	Kyorugi For Male Under 58kg	17 May
Silver	Sophy Sok	Vovinam	Women's -55kg	18 May
Silver	Somaly Chuk	Vovinam	Women's 65kg	19 May
Silver	Sari Mo	Wrestling	Men's freestyle 97 kg	19 May
Silver	Than Heng; Bora Nhem; Vanna Sieng	Pétanque	Men's Triples	19 May
Silver	Sokhor Has; Sreypov Mo; Bunthoeun Trorn	Gymnastics	Aerobic-Trio	21 May
Silver	Sokhor Has; Sreypov Mo	Gymnastics	Aerobic-Mix Pair	22 May
Silver	Sreypov Mo; Tola Nget; Chanbory Choeun	Gymnastics	Aerobic-Group	22 May
Silver	Phearak Ong	Boxing	Men's 81kg - 91kg	22 May
Bronze	Rakim San	Kickboxing	Men's Low kick -63.5kg	10 May
Bronze	Sophean Phorn; Somrach Chov	Rowing	Men's Double sculls	11 May
Bronze	Chanmean Sok	Pétanque	Men's Shooting	13 May
Bronze	Sreymom Ouk	Pétanque	Women's Shooting	13 May
Bronze	Sametprampekeo Mom	Wushu	Men's Sanda 56kg	14 May
Bronze	Muychantharith Mao	Wushu	Men's Sanda 60kg	14 May
Bronze	Dany Phatt	Wushu	Women's Sanda 52kg	14 May
Bronze	Vichny Heang; Chourlyka Nop	Pétanque	Women's Doubles	15 May
Bronze	Sokhouy Mab	Jujitsu	Women's U 45kg - NOGI	15 May
Bronze	Soklong Chhun	Taekwondo	Kyorugi For Male Under 68kg	17 May
Bronze	Chan Leakhena Soeur; Sokha Pov	Vovinam	Female couple hand practice: Dual form	18 May
Bronze	Samnang Dit	Wrestling	Women's Freestyle 50kg	18 May
Bronze	Kanna Chea	Wrestling	Women's Freestyle 62 kg	18 May
Bronze	Aliza Chhoeung	Taekwondo	Kyorugi For Female Under 57kg	18 May
Bronze	Sok Vicheka Lim	Karate	Women's -55kg Kumite	19 May
Bronze	Milad Mardas Cheun	Karate	Men's -75kg Kumite	19 May
Bronze	Sokha Pov; Chanleakhena Soeur	Vovinam	Female couple weapon practice: Pair sword form	19 May
Bronze	Sreychhay Vy	Muaythai	Women's Combat 54kg	19 May
Bronze	Ammarin Phouthong Eh	Vovinam	Men's 60 kg	19 May
Bronze	Samnang Sam	Muaythai	Women's Combat 63.5 kg	19 May
Bronze	Soudanihen Vann	Karate	Women's +68kg Kumite	19 May
Bronze	Vuthy Heng	Wrestling	Men’s Freestyle 86kg	19 May
Bronze	Sophors Soeun	Wrestling	Men’s Freestyle 57kg	19 May
Bronze	Noun Eng	Judo	Women's -63kg	19 May
Bronze	Kimheang Hun	Boxing	Men's 69kg - 75kg	19 May
Bronze	Casandre Nicole Tubbs	Taekwondo	Kyorugi For Female Under 62kg	19 May
Bronze	Sreysros Vy	Boxing	Women's 54kg - 57kg	19 May
Bronze	Chankanika Em	Vovinam	Female Single hand practice: Dragon tiger form	20 May
Bronze	Soeng Moeuy	Muaythai	Women's Combat 51 kg	20 May
Bronze	Sokha Pov	Vovinam	Female single weapon practice: Ying- Yang sword form	20 May
Bronze	Socheat San; Piseth Chin; Bunlong Chren<Tiza Ny	Vovinam	Male multiple weapon practice: 01 player defends against 03 others with weapon	20 May
Bronze	Bora Khun	Muaythai	Men's Combat 60 kg	20 May
Bronze	Prom Samnang	Muaythai	Men's Combat 81 kg	20 May
Bronze	Rangsey Sao	Boxing	Men's 52kg - 57kg	20 May
Bronze	Chanbory Choeun	Gymnastics	Aerobic-Men's Individual	21 May
Bronze	Cahnhout Sean	Vovinam	Male single weapon practice: Four - element staff form	21 May
Bronze	Din Ten	Vovinam	Men's -55kg	21 May
Bronze	Reaseykeo Lang; Sok Nenag Mon; Heng Soeurn; Nimul Mourn; Piseth Kong; Pearoth Chheang; Phaniet Phol; Sarun Pin; Veasna Voeurn; Ratanak Phol; Mom Kuon; Sok Heang An; Channaro Soun; Sovandara Khim	Volleyball	Indoor-Men’s Team	21 May
Bronze	Sreyphin Tuon	Muaythai	Women's Combat 60 kg	21 May
Bronze	Channthun Chhom; Tithsatya Toun; Sokwadthanoon Lim; Keouodom Lim	Finswimming	Fin swimming-Men's Relay 4 x 200m Surface	21 May
Bronze	Boramey Ly; Socheat San; Bunlong Chren	Vovinam	Male leg - attack technique: 04 males, each performs 2 legs attack techniques	22 May
