= List of Malaysian records in Olympic weightlifting =

There are two different kinds of Olympic weightlifting records in Malaysia and certified by the Malaysian Weightlifting Federation (MWF):

- National record, more commonly referred to in Malaysia as the rekod kebangsaan: the best result recorded anywhere in the world by a weightlifter or team holding Malaysian citizenship.
- Malaysian All-Comers record: the best result recorded within Malaysia by a weightlifter or team regardless of nationality.

Key to tables:

Legend: # – Record awaiting ratification by Malaysian Weightlifting Federation; WR – World record; AS – Asian record; CR – Commonwealth record

== Current records ==
=== Men ===
Event	Record	Athlete	Date	Meet	Place	Ref
60 kg
Snatch	125 kg	Aniq Kasdan	13 December 2025	SEA Games	Chonburi, Thailand	
Clean & Jerk	160 kg	Aniq Kasdan	13 December 2025	SEA Games	Chonburi, Thailand	
Total	285 kg	Aniq Kasdan	13 December 2025	SEA Games	Chonburi, Thailand	
65 kg
Snatch	133 kg	Muhamad Aznil Bidin	14 December 2025	SEA Games	Chonburi, Thailand	
Clean & Jerk	173 kg	Muhamad Aznil Bidin	14 December 2025	SEA Games	Chonburi, Thailand	
Total	306 kg	Muhamad Aznil Bidin	14 December 2025	SEA Games	Chonburi, Thailand	
71 kg
Snatch						
Clean & Jerk						
Total						
79 kg
Snatch	149 kg	Hidayat Muhammad Erry	15 December 2025	SEA Games	Chonburi, Thailand	
Clean & Jerk	187 kg	Hidayat Muhammad Erry	15 December 2025	SEA Games	Chonburi, Thailand	
Total	336 kg	Hidayat Muhammad Erry	15 December 2025	SEA Games	Chonburi, Thailand	
85 kg
Snatch	140 kg	Erry Hidayat	28 September 2026	Asian Games	Nagoya, Japan	
Clean & Jerk	172 kg	Erry Hidayat	28 September 2026	Asian Games	Nagoya, Japan	
Total	312 kg	Erry Hidayat	28 September 2026	Asian Games	Nagoya, Japan	
95 kg
Snatch	153 kg	Syahmi Nor Ghazali	28 September 2026	Asian Games	Nagoya, Japan	
Clean & Jerk	200 kg	Syahmi Nor Ghazali	28 September 2026	Asian Games	Nagoya, Japan	
Total	353 kg	Syahmi Nor Ghazali	28 September 2026	Asian Games	Nagoya, Japan	
110 kg
Snatch	145 kg	Kamarul Muhammad Farris Haikal	17 December 2025	SEA Games	Chonburi, Thailand	
Clean & Jerk	190 kg	Kamarul Muhammad Farris Haikal	17 December 2025	SEA Games	Chonburi, Thailand	
Total	335 kg	Kamarul Muhammad Farris Haikal	17 December 2025	SEA Games	Chonburi, Thailand	
+110 kg
Snatch	142 kg	Muhammad Farris Haikal Bin Kamarul	30 July 2026	Commonwealth Games	Glasgow, United Kingdom	
Clean & Jerk	180 kg	Muhammad Farris Haikal Bin Kamarul	30 July 2026	Commonwealth Games	Glasgow, United Kingdom	
Total	322 kg	Muhammad Farris Haikal Bin Kamarul	30 July 2026	Commonwealth Games	Glasgow, United Kingdom	

=== Women ===
Event	Record	Athlete	Date	Meet	Place	Ref
48 kg
Snatch	77 kg	Irene Jane Henry	26 July 2026	Commonwealth Games	Glasgow, United Kingdom	
Clean & Jerk	94 kg	Irene Jane Henry	13 December 2025	SEA Games	Chonburi, Thailand	
Total	169 kg	Irene Jane Henry	13 December 2025	SEA Games	Chonburi, Thailand	
53 kg
Snatch						
Clean & Jerk						
Total						
58 kg
Snatch	70 kg	Alia Adani Binti Johari	9 November 2025	Islamic Solidarity Games	Riyadh, Saudi Arabia	
Clean & Jerk						
Total						
63 kg
Snatch	91 kg	Radzi Nur Syazwani	15 December 2025	SEA Games	Chonburi, Thailand	
Clean & Jerk	115 kg	Radzi Nur Syazwani	28 July 2026	Commonwealth Games	Glasgow, United Kingdom	
Total	204 kg	Radzi Nur Syazwani	15 December 2025	SEA Games	Chonburi, Thailand	
69 kg
Snatch						
Clean & Jerk						
Total						
77 kg
Snatch						
Clean & Jerk						
Total						
86 kg
Snatch						
Clean & Jerk						
Total						
+86 kg
Snatch						
Clean & Jerk						
Total						

== Historical records ==
=== Men (2018–2025) ===
Event	Record	Athlete	Date	Meet	Place	Ref
55 kg
Snatch	112 kg	Azroy Hazalwafie	20 April 2019	Asian Championships	Ningbo, China	
Clean & Jerk	142 kg	Aniq Kasdan	7 December 2021	World Championships	Tashkent, Uzbekistan	
Total	252 kg	Aniq Kasdan	19 May 2022	Southeast Asian Games	Hanoi, Vietnam	
61 kg
Snatch	130 kg	Aniq Kasdan	7 August 2024	Olympic Games	Paris, France	
Clean & Jerk	170 kg	Aniq Kasdan	5 December 2023	IWF Grand Prix	Doha, Qatar	
Total	297 kg	Aniq Kasdan	7 August 2024	Olympic Games	Paris, France	
67 kg
Snatch	130 kg	Aznil Bidin	8 October 2022	Asian Championships	Manama, Bahrain	
Clean & Jerk	161 kg	Aznil Bidin	8 October 2022	Asian Championships	Manama, Bahrain	
Total	291 kg	Aznil Bidin	8 October 2022	Asian Championships	Manama, Bahrain	
73 kg
Snatch	143 kg	Muhammad Erry Hidayat	21 May 2022	Southeast Asian Games	Hanoi, Vietnam	
Clean & Jerk	173 kg	Muhammad Erry Hidayat	21 May 2022	Southeast Asian Games	Hanoi, Vietnam	
Total	316 kg	Muhammad Erry Hidayat	21 May 2022	Southeast Asian Games	Hanoi, Vietnam	
81 kg
Snatch	140 kg	Mohammad Nasir Roslan	21 May 2022	Southeast Asian Games	Hanoi, Vietnam	
Clean & Jerk	165 kg	Mohammad Nasir Roslan	21 May 2022	Southeast Asian Games	Hanoi, Vietnam	
Total	305 kg	Mohammad Nasir Roslan	21 May 2022	Southeast Asian Games	Hanoi, Vietnam	
89 kg
Snatch						
Clean & Jerk						
Total						
96 kg
Snatch						
Clean & Jerk						
Total						
102 kg
Snatch						
Clean & Jerk						
Total						
109 kg
Snatch	148 kg	Muhammad Hafiz Shamsuddin	3 August 2022	Commonwealth Games	Marston Green, United Kingdom	
Clean & Jerk						
Total						
+109 kg
Snatch						
Clean & Jerk						
Total						

=== Women (2018–2025) ===
Event	Record	Athlete	Date	Meet	Place	Ref
45 kg
Snatch	65 kg	Qistina Qharisya Suffia	19 August 2024	Sukma Games	Betong, Malaysia	
Clean & Jerk	79 kg	Qistina Qharisya Suffia	19 August 2024	Sukma Games	Betong, Malaysia	
Total	144 kg	Qistina Qharisya Suffia	19 August 2024	Sukma Games	Betong, Malaysia	
49 kg
Snatch						
Clean & Jerk						
Total						
55 kg
Snatch	85 kg	Nur Atikah Sobri	14 May 2023	Southeast Asian Games	Phnom Penh, Cambodia	
Clean & Jerk	100 kg	Nur Atikah Sobri	14 May 2023	Southeast Asian Games	Phnom Penh, Cambodia	
Total	185 kg	Nur Atikah Sobri	14 May 2023	Southeast Asian Games	Phnom Penh, Cambodia	
59 kg
Snatch	73 kg	Marceeta Marcus	20 May 2022	Southeast Asian Games	Hanoi, Vietnam	
Clean & Jerk	105 kg	Marceeta Marcus	20 May 2022	Southeast Asian Games	Hanoi, Vietnam	
Total	178 kg	Marceeta Marcus	20 May 2022	Southeast Asian Games	Hanoi, Vietnam	
64 kg
Snatch	80 kg	Nur Syazwani Radzi	15 May 2023	Southeast Asian Games	Phnom Penh, Cambodia	
Clean & Jerk	104 kg	Nur Syazwani Radzi	15 May 2023	Southeast Asian Games	Phnom Penh, Cambodia	
Total	184 kg	Nur Syazwani Radzi	15 May 2023	Southeast Asian Games	Phnom Penh, Cambodia	
71 kg
Snatch	81 kg	Jabriella Samuel	4 December 2019	Southeast Asian Games	Manila, Philippines	
Clean & Jerk	100 kg	Jabriella Samuel	4 December 2019	Southeast Asian Games	Manila, Philippines	
Total	181 kg	Jabriella Samuel	4 December 2019	Southeast Asian Games	Manila, Philippines	
76 kg
Snatch						
Clean & Jerk						
Total						
81 kg
Snatch						
Clean & Jerk						
Total						
87 kg
Snatch						
Clean & Jerk						
Total						
+87 kg
Snatch						
Clean & Jerk						
Total						

=== Men (1998–2018) ===
Event	Record	Athlete	Date	Meet	Place	Ref
56 kg
Snatch	121 kg	Amirul Hamizan Ibrahim	28 April 2008	Asian Championships	Kanazawa, Japan	
Clean & Jerk	147 kg	Amirul Hamizan Ibrahim	3 December 2009	Southeast Asian Games	Vientiane, Laos	
Total	265 kg	Amirul Hamizan Ibrahim	12 August 2008	Olympic Games	Beijing, China	
62 kg
Snatch	127 kg	Constantine Clement	28 May 2014	Sukma Games	Kangar, Malaysia	
Clean & Jerk	162 kg	Muhamad Aznil Bidin	5 April 2018	Commonwealth Games	Gold Coast, Australia	
Total	288 kg	Muhamad Aznil Bidin	5 April 2018	Commonwealth Games	Gold Coast, Australia	
69 kg
Snatch	142 kg	Constantine Clement	10 December 2014	National Championships	Sabah, Malaysia	
Clean & Jerk	180 kg	Mohd Hafifi Mansor	4 November 2011	World Championships	Paris, France	
Total	316 kg	Mohd Hafifi Mansor	9 August 2016	Olympic Games	Rio de Janeiro, Brazil	
77 kg
Snatch	145 kg	Loro Wellkinsin Peugi	28 April 2016	Asian Championships	Tashkent, Uzbekistan	
Clean & Jerk	181 kg	Mohd Hafifi Mansor	10 December 2015	Qatar Cup	Doha, Qatar	
Total	321 kg	Mohd Hafifi Mansor	10 December 2015	Qatar Cup	Doha, Qatar	
85 kg
Snatch	150 kg	Mohamad Fazrul Azrie Mohdad	27 July 2016	Sukma Games	Kuching, Malaysia	
Clean & Jerk	183 kg	Mohamad Fazrul Azrie Mohdad	7 April 2018	Commonwealth Games	Gold Coast, Australia	
Total	328 kg	Mohamad Fazrul Azrie Mohdad	7 April 2018	Commonwealth Games	Gold Coast, Australia	
94 kg
Snatch	152.5 kg	Edmund Yeo Thien Chuan	4 December 1999	National Championships	Malacca, Malaysia	
Clean & Jerk	190 kg	Edmund Yeo Thien Chuan	4 December 1999	National Championships	Malacca, Malaysia	
Total	342.5 kg	Edmund Yeo Thien Chuan	4 December 1999	National Championships	Malacca, Malaysia	
105 kg
Snatch	152 kg	Elisha Louis Tan Kim Ho	15 March 2015	National Championships	Penang, Malaysia	
Clean & Jerk	192.5 kg	Edmund Yeo Thien Chuan	7 April 2002	National Championships	Penang, Malaysia	
Total	342.5 kg	Edmund Yeo Thien Chuan	7 April 2002	National Championships	Penang, Malaysia	
+105 kg
Snatch	165 kg	Che Mohd Azrul Che Mat	12 December 2007	Southeast Asian Games	Nakhon Ratchasima, Thailand	
Clean & Jerk	191 kg	Abd Azim Najmi Abd Rashid	30 November 2013	Commonwealth Championships	Penang, Malaysia	
Total	355 kg	Che Mohd Azrul Che Mat	12 December 2007	Southeast Asian Games	Nakhon Ratchasima, Thailand	

=== Women (1998–2018) ===
Event	Record	Athlete	Date	Meet	Place	Ref
48 kg
Snatch	75 kg	Zaira Zakaria	3 October 2010	Commonwealth Games	New Delhi, India	
Clean & Jerk	94 kg	Zaira Zakaria	10 December 2009	Southeast Asian Games	Vientiane, Laos	
Total	165 kg	Zaira Zakaria	4 June 2008	Sukma Games	Terengganu, Malaysia	
53 kg
Snatch	83 kg	Azizah Fadzil	24 April 2014	Pre-Sukma Championships	Kangar, Malaysia	
Clean & Jerk	100 kg	Azizah Fadzil	12 December 2013	Southeast Asian Games	Yangon, Myanmar	
Total	178 kg	Azizah Fadzil	24 April 2014	Pre-Sukma Championships	Kangar, Malaysia	
58 kg
Snatch	83 kg	Nur Farisha Irwana Md Supian	19 February 2014	National Circuit	Kelantan, Malaysia	
Clean & Jerk	101 kg	Frenceay Titus	11 November 2011	Southeast Asian Games	Palembang, Indonesia	
Total	181 kg	Frenceay Titus	13 December 2013	Southeast Asian Games	Yangon, Myanmar	
63 kg
Snatch	90 kg	Nurul Farhana Johari	9 May 2009	Asian Championships	Taldykorgan, Kazakhstan	
Clean & Jerk	110 kg	Nurul Farhana Johari	9 May 2009	Asian Championships	Taldykorgan, Kazakhstan	
Total	200 kg	Nurul Farhana Johari	9 May 2009	Asian Championships	Taldykorgan, Kazakhstan	
69 kg
Snatch	83 kg	Norkhasida Abd Halim	14 December 2013	Southeast Asian Games	Yangon, Myanmar	
Clean & Jerk	106 kg	Norkhasida Abd Halim	27 June 2015	Southeast Asian Championships	Pattaya, Thailand	
Total	188 kg	Norkhasida Abd Halim	14 December 2013	Southeast Asian Games	Yangon, Myanmar	
75 kg
Snatch	85 kg	Arisha Farra Erwin	17 June 2010	Sukma Games	Malacca, Malaysia	
Clean & Jerk	103 kg	Intan Ayuni Abdullah	27 March 2013	National Championships	Sabah, Malaysia	
Total	187 kg	Arisha Farra Erwin	17 June 2010	Sukma Games	Malacca, Malaysia	
90 kg
Snatch	91 kg	Siti Aisyah Md Rosli	9 April 2018	Commonwealth Games	Gold Coast, Australia	
Clean & Jerk	123 kg	Siti Aisyah Md Rosli	9 April 2018	Commonwealth Games	Gold Coast, Australia	
Total	214 kg	Siti Aisyah Md Rosli	9 April 2018	Commonwealth Games	Gold Coast, Australia	
+90 kg
Snatch	102 kg	Nur Jannah Batrisyah	26 April 2014	Pre-Sukma Championships	Kangar, Malaysia	
Clean & Jerk	130 kg	Nur Jannah Batrisyah	26 April 2014	Pre-Sukma Championships	Kangar, Malaysia	
Total	232 kg	Nur Jannah Batrisyah	26 April 2014	Pre-Sukma Championships	Kangar, Malaysia	

== Historical Malaysian All-Comers records ==
=== Men (1998–2018) ===
Event	Record	Athlete	Nation	Date	Meet	Place	Ref
52 kg
Snatch	98 kg	Mohd Fazli Dollah	Malaysia	June 2010	Sukma Games	Malacca, Malaysia	
Clean & Jerk	118 kg	Lester Avin Ambrose	Malaysia	June 2010	Sukma Games	Malacca, Malaysia	
Total	214 kg	Mohd Fazli Dollah	Malaysia	June 2010	Sukma Games	Malacca, Malaysia	
56 kg
Snatch	115 kg	Mohd Shafiq Ismail	Malaysia	June 2010	Sukma Games	Malacca, Malaysia	
Clean & Jerk	140 kg	Dharmaraj Wilson	India	16 September 1998	Commonwealth Games	Kuala Lumpur, Malaysia	
Total	251 kg	Mohd Shafiq Ismail	Malaysia	June 2010	Sukma Games	Malacca, Malaysia	
62 kg
Snatch	127 kg	Constantine Clement	Malaysia	28 May 2014	Sukma Games	Kangar, Malaysia	
Clean & Jerk	167.5 kg	Marcus Stephen	Nauru	16 September 1998	Commonwealth Games	Kuala Lumpur, Malaysia	
Total	292.5 kg	Marcus Stephen	Nauru	16 September 1998	Commonwealth Games	Kuala Lumpur, Malaysia	
69 kg
Snatch	142 kg	Constantine Clement	Malaysia	10 December 2014	National Championships	Sabah, Malaysia	
Clean & Jerk	167.5 kg	Muhamad Hidayat Hamidon	Malaysia	September 1998	Commonwealth Games	Kuala Lumpur, Malaysia	
Total	297.5 kg	Sebastien Groulx	Canada	September 1998	Commonwealth Games	Kuala Lumpur, Malaysia	
77 kg
Snatch	147.5 kg	Satheesha Rai	India	September 1998	Commonwealth Games	Kuala Lumpur, Malaysia	
Clean & Jerk	187.5 kg	Damian Brown	Australia	September 1998	Commonwealth Games	Kuala Lumpur, Malaysia	
Total	327.5 kg	Damian Brown	Australia	September 1998	Commonwealth Games	Kuala Lumpur, Malaysia	
85 kg
Snatch	157.5 kg	Stephen Ward	England	18 September 1998	Commonwealth Games	Kuala Lumpur, Malaysia	
Clean & Jerk	192.5 kg	Leon Griffin	England	18 September 1998	Commonwealth Games	Kuala Lumpur, Malaysia	
Total	347.5 kg	Leon Griffin	England	18 September 1998	Commonwealth Games	Kuala Lumpur, Malaysia	
94 kg
Snatch	165 kg	Kiril Kounev	Australia	September 1998	Commonwealth Games	Kuala Lumpur, Malaysia	
Clean & Jerk	205 kg	Kiril Kounev	Australia	September 1998	Commonwealth Games	Kuala Lumpur, Malaysia	
Total	370 kg	Kiril Kounev	Australia	September 1998	Commonwealth Games	Kuala Lumpur, Malaysia	
105 kg
Snatch	167.5 kg	Akos Sandor	Canada	September 1998	Commonwealth Games	Kuala Lumpur, Malaysia	
Clean & Jerk	192.5 kg	Akos Sandor	Canada	September 1998	Commonwealth Games	Kuala Lumpur, Malaysia	
Total	360 kg	Akos Sandor	Canada	September 1998	Commonwealth Games	Kuala Lumpur, Malaysia	
+105 kg
Snatch	165 kg	Darren Liddel	New Zealand	19 September 1998	Commonwealth Games	Kuala Lumpur, Malaysia	
Clean & Jerk	202.5 kg	Darren Liddel	New Zealand	19 September 1998	Commonwealth Games	Kuala Lumpur, Malaysia	
Total	367.5 kg	Darren Liddel	New Zealand	19 September 1998	Commonwealth Games	Kuala Lumpur, Malaysia	

=== Women (1998–2018) ===
Event	Record	Athlete	Nation	Date	Meet	Place	Ref
48 kg
Snatch	72 kg	Zaira Zakaria	Malaysia	4 June 2008	Sukma Games	Terengganu, Malaysia	
Clean & Jerk	93 kg	Zaira Zakaria	Malaysia	4 June 2008	Sukma Games	Terengganu, Malaysia	
Total	165 kg	Zaira Zakaria	Malaysia	4 June 2008	Sukma Games	Terengganu, Malaysia	
53 kg
Snatch	83 kg	Azizah Fadzil	Malaysia	24 April 2014	Pre-Sukma Championships	Kangar, Malaysia	
Clean & Jerk	90 kg	Raihan Yusof	Malaysia	June 2008	Sukma Games	Terengganu, Malaysia	
Total	178 kg	Azizah Fadzil	Malaysia	24 April 2014	Pre-Sukma Championships	Kangar, Malaysia	
58 kg
Snatch	83 kg	Nur Farisha Irwana Md Supian	Malaysia	19 February 2014	National Circuit	Kelantan, Malaysia	
Clean & Jerk	96 kg	Nur Farisha Irwana Md Supian	Malaysia	30 May 2014	Sukma Games	Kangar, Malaysia	
Total	176 kg	Frenceay Titus	Malaysia	July 2012	Sukma Games	Kuantan, Malaysia	
63 kg
Snatch	81 kg	Nurul Farhana Johari	Malaysia	June 2010	Sukma Games	Malacca, Malaysia	
Clean & Jerk	101 kg	Nurul Farhana Johari	Malaysia	June 2010	Sukma Games	Malacca, Malaysia	
Total	182 kg	Nurul Farhana Johari	Malaysia	June 2010	Sukma Games	Malacca, Malaysia	
69 kg
Snatch	75 kg	Fatin Amira Mohd Nasir	Malaysia	28 July 2016	Sukma Games	Kuching, Malaysia	
Clean & Jerk	95 kg	Fatin Amira Mohd Nasir	Malaysia	28 July 2016	Sukma Games	Kuching, Malaysia	
Total	166 kg	Norkhasida Abd Halim	Malaysia	June 2010	Sukma Games	Malacca, Malaysia	
75 kg
Snatch	85 kg	Arisha Farra Erwin	Malaysia	17 June 2010	Sukma Games	Malacca, Malaysia	
Clean & Jerk	103 kg	Intan Ayuni Abdullah	Malaysia	27 March 2013	National Championships	Sabah, Malaysia	
Total	187 kg	Arisha Farra Erwin	Malaysia	17 June 2010	Sukma Games	Malacca, Malaysia	
+75 kg
Snatch	102 kg	Nur Jannah Batrisyah	Malaysia	26 April 2014	Pre-Sukma Championships	Kangar, Malaysia	
Clean & Jerk	130 kg	Nur Jannah Batrisyah	Malaysia	26 April 2014	Pre-Sukma Championships	Kangar, Malaysia	
Total	232 kg	Nur Jannah Batrisyah	Malaysia	26 April 2014	Pre-Sukma Championships	Kangar, Malaysia	
