= List of Philippine records in Olympic weightlifting =

The following are the national records in Olympic weightlifting in Philippines. Records are maintained in each weight class for the snatch lift, clean and jerk lift, and the total for both lifts by the Samahang Weightlifting ng Pilipinas.

== Current records ==
=== Men ===
Event	Record	Athlete	Date	Meet	Place	Ref
60 kg
Snatch	119 kg	Agad Fernando Jr.	13 December 2025	SEA Games	Chonburi, Thailand	
Clean & Jerk	150 kg	Agad Fernando Jr.	13 December 2025	SEA Games	Chonburi, Thailand	
Total	269 kg	Agad Fernando Jr.	13 December 2025	SEA Games	Chonburi, Thailand	
65 kg
Snatch	125 kg	Dave Llyod Pacaldo	14 December 2025	SEA Games	Chonburi, Thailand	
Clean & Jerk	165 kg	Dave Llyod Pacaldo	14 December 2025	SEA Games	Chonburi, Thailand	
Total	290 kg	Dave Llyod Pacaldo	14 December 2025	SEA Games	Chonburi, Thailand	
70 kg
Snatch	144 kg	Albert Delos Santos	30 October 2026	World Championships	Ningbo, China	
Clean & Jerk	187 kg	Albert Delos Santos	4 May 2026	World Junior Championships	Ismailia, Egypt	
Total	331 kg	Albert Delos Santos	30 October 2026	World Championships	Ningbo, China	
75 kg
Snatch						
Clean & Jerk						
Total						
85 kg
Snatch						
Clean & Jerk						
Total						
95 kg
Snatch						
Clean & Jerk						
Total						
110 kg
Snatch						
Clean & Jerk						
Total						
+110 kg
Snatch						
Clean & Jerk						
Total						

=== Women ===
Event	Record	Athlete	Date	Meet	Place	Ref
49 kg
Snatch	83 kg	Rosegie Ramos	13 December 2025	SEA Games	Chonburi, Thailand	
Clean & Jerk	98 kg	Alexsandra Diaz	5 July 2026	World Youth Championships	Cali, Colombia	
Total	175 kg	Alexsandra Diaz	5 July 2026	World Youth Championships	Cali, Colombia	
53 kg
Snatch	93 kg	Rosegie Ramos	23 September 2026	Asian Games	Nagoya, Japan	
Clean & Jerk	110 kg	Rosegie Ramos	23 September 2026	Asian Games	Nagoya, Japan	
Total	203 kg	Rosegie Ramos	23 September 2026	Asian Games	Nagoya, Japan	
57 kg
Snatch	90 kg	Hidilyn Diaz	14 December 2025	SEA Games	Chonburi, Thailand	
Clean & Jerk	110 kg	Hidilyn Diaz	14 December 2025	SEA Games	Chonburi, Thailand	
Total	200 kg	Hidilyn Diaz	14 December 2025	SEA Games	Chonburi, Thailand	
61 kg
Snatch	102 kg	Elreen Ando	15 December 2025	SEA Games	Chonburi, Thailand	
Clean & Jerk	127 kg	Elreen Ando	15 December 2025	SEA Games	Chonburi, Thailand	
Total	229 kg	Elreen Ando	15 December 2025	SEA Games	Chonburi, Thailand	
69 kg
Snatch	102 kg	Kristel Macrohon	27 September 2026	Asian Games	Nagoya, Japan	
Clean & Jerk	125 kg	Kristel Macrohon	27 September 2026	Asian Games	Nagoya, Japan	
Total	227 kg	Kristel Macrohon	27 September 2026	Asian Games	Nagoya, Japan	
77 kg
Snatch						
Clean & Jerk						
Total						
86 kg
Snatch						
Clean & Jerk						
Total						
+86 kg
Snatch						
Clean & Jerk						
Total						

== Historical records ==
=== Men (2018–2025) ===
Event	Record	Athlete	Date	Meet	Place	Ref
55 kg
Snatch	117 kg	John Ceniza	18 September 2019	World Championships	Pattaya, Thailand	
Clean & Jerk	147 kg	Fernando Agad	6 December 2024	World Championships	Manama, Bahrain	
Total	263 kg	Fernando Agad	6 December 2024	World Championships	Manama, Bahrain	
61 kg
Snatch	134 kg	John Ceniza	1 October 2023	Asian Games	Hangzhou, China	
Clean & Jerk	170 kg	John Ceniza	13 July 2023	National Championships	Bacolod, Philippines	
Total	300 kg	John Ceniza	13 July 2023	National Championships	Bacolod, Philippines	
67 kg
Snatch	134 kg	Albert Delos Santos	1 May 2025	World Junior Championships	Lima, Peru	
Clean & Jerk	175 kg	Albert Delos Santos	1 May 2025	World Junior Championships	Lima, Peru	
Total	309 kg	Albert Delos Santos	1 May 2025	World Junior Championships	Lima, Peru	
73 kg
Snatch	130 kg	Denmark Lemon	21 May 2022	Southeast Asian Games	Hanoi, Vietnam	
Clean & Jerk	165 kg	Denmark Lemon	21 May 2022	Southeast Asian Games	Hanoi, Vietnam	
Total	295 kg	Denmark Lemon	21 May 2022	Southeast Asian Games	Hanoi, Vietnam	
81 kg
Snatch	127 kg	Jones Bodah	25 October 2019	Asian Junior Championships	Pyongyang, North Korea	
Clean & Jerk	150 kg	Jones Bodah	25 October 2019	Asian Junior Championships	Pyongyang, North Korea	
Total	277 kg	Jones Bodah	25 October 2019	Asian Junior Championships	Pyongyang, North Korea	
89 kg
Snatch	140 kg	John Tabique	16 May 2023	Southeast Asian Games	Phnom Penh, Cambodia	
Clean & Jerk	170 kg	John Tabique	16 May 2023	Southeast Asian Games	Phnom Penh, Cambodia	
Total	310 kg	John Tabique	16 May 2023	Southeast Asian Games	Phnom Penh, Cambodia	
96 kg
Snatch	137 kg	John Tabique	13 December 2021	World Championships	Tashkent, Uzbekistan	
Clean & Jerk	170 kg	John Tabique	23 April 2021	Asian Championships	Tashkent, Uzbekistan	
Total	305 kg	John Tabique	23 April 2021	Asian Championships	Tashkent, Uzbekistan	
102 kg
Snatch	143 kg	John Tabique	15 May 2022	Southeast Asian Games	Hanoi, Vietnam	
Clean & Jerk	179 kg	John Tabique	15 May 2022	Southeast Asian Games	Hanoi, Vietnam	
Total	322 kg	John Tabique	15 May 2022	Southeast Asian Games	Hanoi, Vietnam	
109 kg
Snatch	115 kg	Clyde Enriquez	27 October 2019	Asian Junior Championships	Pyongyang, North Korea	
Clean & Jerk	150 kg	Clyde Enriquez	27 October 2019	Asian Junior Championships	Pyongyang, North Korea	
Total	265 kg	Clyde Enriquez	27 October 2019	Asian Junior Championships	Pyongyang, North Korea	
+109 kg
Snatch	130 kg	Richard Pep Agosto	24 August 2019	World Masters Championships	Montreal, Canada	
Clean & Jerk	160 kg	Richard Pep Agosto	24 August 2019	World Masters Championships	Montreal, Canada	
Total	290 kg	Richard Pep Agosto	24 August 2019	World Masters Championships	Montreal, Canada	

=== Women (2018–2025) ===
Event	Record	Athlete	Date	Meet	Place	Ref
45 kg
Snatch	74 kg	Angeline Colonia	11 February 2023	SWP 2023 Southeast Asian Games Qualifiers	Manila, Philippines	
Clean & Jerk	89 kg	Mary Flor Diaz	21 April 2019	Asian Championships	Ningbo, China	
Total	161 kg	Rose Jean Ramos	5 May 2023	Asian Championships	Jinju, South Korea	
49 kg
Snatch	88 kg	Rosegie Ramos	5 December 2023	IWF Grand Prix II	Doha, Qatar	
Clean & Jerk	106 kg	Lovely Inan	5 September 2023	World Championships	Riyadh, Saudi Arabia	
Total	191 kg	Rosegie Ramos	5 December 2023	IWF Grand Prix II	Doha, Qatar	
55 kg
Snatch	97 kg	Hidilyn Diaz	26 July 2021	Olympic Games	Tokyo, Japan	
Clean & Jerk	127 kg	Hidilyn Diaz	26 July 2021	Olympic Games	Tokyo, Japan	
Total	224 kg	Hidilyn Diaz	26 July 2021	Olympic Games	Tokyo, Japan	
59 kg
Snatch	100 kg	Elreen Ando	8 September 2023	World Championships	Riyadh, Saudi Arabia	
Clean & Jerk	130 kg	Elreen Ando	8 August 2024	Olympic Games	Paris, France	
Total	230 kg	Elreen Ando	8 August 2024	Olympic Games	Paris, France	
64 kg
Snatch	103 kg	Elreen Ando	21 May 2022	Southeast Asian Games	Hanoi, Vietnam	
Clean & Jerk	126 kg	Elreen Ando	2 October 2023	Asian Games	Hangzhou, China	
Total	223 kg	Elreen Ando	21 May 2022	Southeast Asian Games	Hanoi, Vietnam	
71 kg
Snatch	110 kg	Vanessa Sarno	7 April 2024	World Cup	Phuket, Thailand	
Clean & Jerk	141 kg	Vanessa Sarno	10 December 2023	IWF Grand Prix	Doha, Qatar	
Total	249 kg	Vanessa Sarno	10 December 2023	IWF Grand Prix	Doha, Qatar	
76 kg
Snatch	105 kg	Vanessa Sarno	5 October 2023	Asian Games	Hangzhou, China	
Clean & Jerk	133 kg	Kristel Macrohon	22 May 2022	Southeast Asian Games	Hanoi, Vietnam	
Total	235 kg	Vanessa Sarno	5 October 2023	Asian Games	Hangzhou, China	
81 kg
Snatch						
Clean & Jerk						
Total						
87 kg
Snatch						
Clean & Jerk						
Total						
+87 kg
Snatch						
Clean & Jerk						
Total						

=== Men (1998–2018) ===
Event	Record	Athlete	Date	Meet	Place	Ref
56 kg
Snatch	124 kg	Nestor Colonia	21 September 2015	World Championships	Houston, United States	
Clean & Jerk	158 kg	Nestor Colonia	21 September 2015	World Championships	Houston, United States	
Total	282 kg	Nestor Colonia	21 September 2015	World Championships	Houston, United States	
62 kg
Snatch	115 kg	Jeffrey Garcia	13 November 2012	Asian Junior Championships	Yangon, Myanmar	
Clean & Jerk	155 kg	Jeffrey Garcia	13 November 2012	Asian Junior Championships	Yangon, Myanmar	
Total	270 kg	Jeffrey Garcia	13 November 2012	Asian Junior Championships	Yangon, Myanmar	
69 kg
Snatch	125 kg	Jeffrey Garcia	22 August 2018	Asian Games	Jakarta, Indonesia	
Clean & Jerk	155 kg	Jeffrey Garcia	22 August 2018	Asian Games	Jakarta, Indonesia	
Total	280 kg	Jeffrey Garcia	22 August 2018	Asian Games	Jakarta, Indonesia	
77 kg
Snatch	125 kg	Roland Colonia	18 November 2011	Southeast Asian Games	Palembang, Indonesia	
Clean & Jerk	155 kg	Martin Patenio	21 May 2014	Philippine National Games	Marikina, Philippines	
Total	275 kg	Roland Colonia	18 November 2011	Southeast Asian Games	Palembang, Indonesia	
85 kg
Snatch	125 kg	Christopher Bureros	12 December 2009	Southeast Asian Games	Vientiane, Laos	
Clean & Jerk	150 kg	Christopher Bureros	12 December 2009	Southeast Asian Games	Vientiane, Laos	
Total	275 kg	Christopher Bureros	12 December 2009	Southeast Asian Games	Vientiane, Laos	
94 kg
Snatch	136 kg	Renante Briones	11 December 2007	Southeast Asian Games	Nakhon Ratchasima, Thailand	
Clean & Jerk	163 kg	Christopher Bureros	19 November 2011	Southeast Asian Games	Palembang, Indonesia	
Total	288 kg	Christopher Bureros	19 November 2011	Southeast Asian Games	Palembang, Indonesia	
105 kg
Snatch	101 kg	Jonel Alejandro	22 May 2014	Philippine National Games	Marikina, Philippines	
Clean & Jerk	122 kg	Jonel Alejandro	22 May 2014	Philippine National Games	Marikina, Philippines	
Total	223 kg	Jonel Alejandro	22 May 2014	Philippine National Games	Marikina, Philippines	
+105 kg
Snatch	140 kg	Richard Pep Agosto	19 November 2011	Southeast Asian Games	Palembang, Indonesia	
Clean & Jerk	190 kg	Richard Pep Agosto	19 November 2011	Southeast Asian Games	Palembang, Indonesia	
Total	330 kg	Richard Pep Agosto	19 November 2011	Southeast Asian Games	Palembang, Indonesia	

=== Women (1998–2018) ===
Event	Record	Athlete	Date	Meet	Place	Ref
48 kg
Snatch	69 kg	Elien Perez	20 August 2018	Asian Games	Jakarta, Indonesia	
Clean & Jerk	85 kg	Elien Perez	20 August 2018	Asian Games	Jakarta, Indonesia	
Total	154 kg	Elien Perez	20 August 2018	Asian Games	Jakarta, Indonesia	
53 kg
Snatch	98 kg	Hidilyn Diaz	27 August 2015	Southeast Asian Championships	Bangkok, Thailand	
Clean & Jerk	118 kg	Hidilyn Diaz	7 September 2015	Asian Championships	Phuket, Thailand	
Total	214 kg	Hidilyn Diaz	7 September 2015	Asian Championships	Phuket, Thailand	
58 kg
Snatch	102 kg	Hidilyn Diaz	15 December 2013	Southeast Asian Games	Naypyidaw, Myanmar	
Clean & Jerk	123 kg	Hidilyn Diaz	30 May 2012	Philippine National Games	Dumaguete, Philippines	
Total	224 kg	Hidilyn Diaz	15 December 2013	Southeast Asian Games	Naypyidaw, Myanmar	
63 kg
Snatch	90 kg	Hidilyn Diaz	6 December 2015	Qatar Cup	Doha, Qatar	
Clean & Jerk	115 kg	Hidilyn Diaz	6 December 2015	Qatar Cup	Doha, Qatar	
Total	205 kg	Hidilyn Diaz	6 December 2015	Qatar Cup	Doha, Qatar	
69 kg
Snatch	88 kg	Kristel Macrohon	22 September 2017	Asian Indoor and Martial Arts Games	Ashgabat, Turkmenistan	
Clean & Jerk	121 kg	Kristel Macrohon	22 September 2017	Asian Indoor and Martial Arts Games	Ashgabat, Turkmenistan	
Total	209 kg	Kristel Macrohon	22 September 2017	Asian Indoor and Martial Arts Games	Ashgabat, Turkmenistan	
75 kg
Snatch	88 kg	Maybelyn Pablo	21 May 2014	Philippine National Games	Marikina, Philippines	
Clean & Jerk	110 kg	Kristel Macrohon	15 December 2016	Qatar Cup	Doha, Qatar	
Total	193 kg	Maybelyn Pablo	21 May 2014	Philippine National Games	Marikina, Philippines	
90 kg
Snatch	85 kg	Angelica Lado	21 May 2014	Philippine National Games	Marikina, Philippines	
Clean & Jerk	105 kg	Angelica Lado	21 May 2014	Philippine National Games	Marikina, Philippines	
Total	190 kg	Angelica Lado	21 May 2014	Philippine National Games	Marikina, Philippines	
+90 kg
Snatch						
Clean & Jerk						
Total						
