= List of Vietnamese records in Olympic weightlifting =

Records in Olympic weightlifting of Vietnam

The following are the national records in Olympic weightlifting in Vietnam. Records are maintained in each weight class for the snatch lift, clean and jerk lift, and the total for both lifts by the Weightlifting Federation of Vietnam.

== Current records ==
=== Men ===
Event	Record	Athlete	Date	Meet	Place	Ref
60 kg
Snatch	125 kg	K'Dương	13 December 2025	SEA Games	Chonburi, Thailand	
Clean & Jerk	164 kg	K'Dương	13 December 2025	SEA Games	Chonburi, Thailand	
Total	289 kg	K'Dương	13 December 2025	SEA Games	Chonburi, Thailand	
65 kg
Snatch	139 kg	Trần Minh Trí	24 September 2026	Asian Games	Nagoya, Japan	
Clean & Jerk	170 kg	Trần Minh Trí	24 September 2026	Asian Games	Nagoya, Japan	
Total	309 kg	Trần Minh Trí	24 September 2026	Asian Games	Nagoya, Japan	
71 kg
Snatch	135 kg	Nguyễn Đức Toàn	14 December 2025	SEA Games	Chonburi, Thailand	
Clean & Jerk	170 kg	Nguyễn Đức Toàn	14 December 2025	SEA Games	Chonburi, Thailand	
Total	305 kg	Nguyễn Đức Toàn	14 December 2025	SEA Games	Chonburi, Thailand	
79 kg
Snatch	145 kg	Nguyễn Quang Truong	15 December 2025	SEA Games	Chonburi, Thailand	
Clean & Jerk	180 kg	Nguyễn Quang Truong	15 December 2025	SEA Games	Chonburi, Thailand	
Total	325 kg	Nguyễn Quang Truong	15 December 2025	SEA Games	Chonburi, Thailand	
88 kg
Snatch	160 kg	Nguyễn Quoc Toàn	16 December 2025	SEA Games	Chonburi, Thailand	
Clean & Jerk	201 kg	Nguyễn Quoc Toàn	16 December 2025	SEA Games	Chonburi, Thailand	
Total	361 kg	Nguyễn Quoc Toàn	16 December 2025	SEA Games	Chonburi, Thailand	
94 kg
Snatch	150 kg	Tran Xuan Dung	16 December 2025	SEA Games	Chonburi, Thailand	
Clean & Jerk	187 kg	Tran Xuan Dung	16 December 2025	SEA Games	Chonburi, Thailand	
Total	337 kg	Tran Xuan Dung	16 December 2025	SEA Games	Chonburi, Thailand	
110 kg
Snatch	155 kg	Tran Dinh Thang	17 December 2025	SEA Games	Chonburi, Thailand	
Clean & Jerk	211 kg	Tran Dinh Thang	17 December 2025	SEA Games	Chonburi, Thailand	
Total	366 kg	Tran Dinh Thang	17 December 2025	SEA Games	Chonburi, Thailand	
+110 kg
Snatch						
Clean & Jerk						
Total						

=== Women ===
Event	Record	Athlete	Date	Meet	Place	Ref
48 kg
Snatch	83 kg	Nguyen Thi Thu Trang	13 December 2025	SEA Games	Chonburi, Thailand	
Clean & Jerk	98 kg	Nguyen Thi Thu Trang	13 December 2025	SEA Games	Chonburi, Thailand	
Total	181 kg	Nguyen Thi Thu Trang	13 December 2025	SEA Games	Chonburi, Thailand	
53 kg
Snatch	88 kg	Nguyen Hoai Huong	13 December 2025	SEA Games	Chonburi, Thailand	
Clean & Jerk	109 kg	Nguyen Hoai Huong	13 December 2025	SEA Games	Chonburi, Thailand	
Total	197 kg	Nguyen Hoai Huong	13 December 2025	SEA Games	Chonburi, Thailand	
58 kg
Snatch	96 kg	Quang Thi Tam	14 December 2025	SEA Games	Chonburi, Thailand	
Clean & Jerk	119 kg	Quang Thi Tam	14 December 2025	SEA Games	Chonburi, Thailand	
Total	215 kg	Quang Thi Tam	14 December 2025	SEA Games	Chonburi, Thailand	
63 kg
Snatch	98 kg	Nguyen Thi Thuy Tien	15 December 2025	SEA Games	Chonburi, Thailand	
Clean & Jerk	121 kg	Nguyen Thi Thuy Tien	15 December 2025	SEA Games	Chonburi, Thailand	
Total	219 kg	Nguyen Thi Thuy Tien	15 December 2025	SEA Games	Chonburi, Thailand	
69 kg
Snatch	94 kg	Hoang Kim Lua	15 December 2025	SEA Games	Chonburi, Thailand	
Clean & Jerk	117 kg	Hoang Kim Lua	15 December 2025	SEA Games	Chonburi, Thailand	
Total	211 kg	Hoang Kim Lua	15 December 2025	SEA Games	Chonburi, Thailand	
77 kg
Snatch	90 kg	Nguyen Thi Phuong	17 December 2025	SEA Games	Chonburi, Thailand	
Clean & Jerk	95 kg	Nguyen Thi Phuong	17 December 2025	SEA Games	Chonburi, Thailand	
Total	185 kg	Nguyen Thi Phuong	17 December 2025	SEA Games	Chonburi, Thailand	
86 kg
Snatch						
Clean & Jerk						
Total						
+86 kg
Snatch						
Clean & Jerk						
Total						

== Historical records ==
=== Men (2018–2025) ===
Event	Record	Athlete	Date	Meet	Place	Ref
55 kg
Snatch	123 kg	Lại Gia Thành	5 September 2023	World Championships	Riyadh, Saudi Arabia	
Clean and Jerk	148 kg	Lại Gia Thành	19 May 2022	Southeast Asian Games	Hanoi, Vietnam	
Total	269 kg	Lại Gia Thành	5 September 2023	World Championships	Riyadh, Saudi Arabia	
61 kg
Snatch	136 kg	Thạch Kim Tuấn	20 April 2019	Asian Championships	Ningbo, China	
Clean & Jerk	169 kg	Thạch Kim Tuấn	2 December 2019	Southeast Asian Games	Manila, Philippines	
Total	304 kg	Thạch Kim Tuấn	2 December 2019	Southeast Asian Games	Manila, Philippines	
67 kg
Snatch	146 kg	Trần Minh Trí	10 May 2025	Asian Championships	Jiangshan, China	
Clean & Jerk	176 kg	Trần Minh Trí	14 May 2023	Southeast Asian Games	Phnom Penh, Cambodia	
Total	318 kg	Trần Minh Trí	10 May 2025	Asian Championships	Jiangshan, China	
73 kg
Snatch	136 kg	Phạm Tuấn Anh	4 December 2019	Southeast Asian Games	Manila, Philippines	
Clean and Jerk	175 kg	Kỷ Bùi Sư	14 May 2023	Southeast Asian Games	Phnom Penh, Cambodia	
Total	311 kg	Kỷ Bùi Sư	14 May 2023	Southeast Asian Games	Phnom Penh, Cambodia	
81 kg
Snatch	150 kg	Nguyen Quoc Toan	21 May 2022	Southeast Asian Games	Hanoi, Vietnam	
Clean and Jerk	190 kg	Nguyen Quoc Toan	21 May 2022	Southeast Asian Games	Hanoi, Vietnam	
Total	340 kg	Nguyen Quoc Toan	21 May 2022	Southeast Asian Games	Hanoi, Vietnam	
89 kg
Snatch	155 kg	Nguyễn Quốc Toàn	16 May 2023	Southeast Asian Games	Phnom Penh, Cambodia	
Clean and Jerk	190 kg	Nguyễn Quốc Toàn	16 May 2023	Southeast Asian Games	Phnom Penh, Cambodia	
Total	345 kg	Nguyễn Quốc Toàn	16 May 2023	Southeast Asian Games	Phnom Penh, Cambodia	
96 kg
Snatch						
Clean and Jerk						
Total						
102 kg
Snatch						
Clean and Jerk						
Total						
109 kg
Snatch						
Clean and Jerk						
Total						
+109 kg
Snatch						
Clean and Jerk						
Total						

=== Women (2018–2025) ===
Event	Record	Athlete	Date	Meet	Place	Ref
45 kg
Snatch	80 kg	Khổng Mỹ Phượng	19 May 2022	Southeast Asian Games	Hanoi, Vietnam	
Clean & Jerk	95 kg	Vương Thị Huyền	1 December 2019	Southeast Asian Games	Manila, Philippines	
Total	172 kg	Vương Thị Huyền	1 December 2019	Southeast Asian Games	Manila, Philippines	
49 kg
Snatch	83 kg	Phạm Đình Thi	30 September 2023	Asian Games	Hangzhou, China	
Clean & Jerk	103 kg	Dihn Thi Pham	19 May 2022	Southeast Asian Games	Hanoi, Vietnam	
Total	184 kg	Phạm Đình Thi	30 September 2023	Asian Games	Hangzhou, China	
55 kg
Snatch	88 kg	Võ Thị Quỳnh Như	6 May 2023	Asian Championships	Jinju, South Korea	
Clean & Jerk	115 kg	Nguyễn Thị Thúy	2 December 2019	Southeast Asian Games	Manila, Philippines	
Total	197 kg	Nguyễn Thị Thúy	2 December 2019	Southeast Asian Games	Manila, Philippines	
59 kg
Snatch	101 kg	Hoang Thi Duyen	23 April 2019	Asian Championships	Ningbo, China	
Clean & Jerk	116 kg	Hoang Thi Duyen	19 April 2021	Asian Championships	Tashkent, Uzbekistan	
Total	216 kg	Hoang Thi Duyen	19 April 2021	Asian Championships	Tashkent, Uzbekistan	
64 kg
Snatch	104 kg	Phạm Thị Hồng Thanh	21 May 2022	Southeast Asian Games	Hanoi, Vietnam	
Clean & Jerk	126 kg	Phạm Thị Hồng Thanh	21 May 2022	Southeast Asian Games	Hanoi, Vietnam	
Total	230 kg	Phạm Thị Hồng Thanh	21 May 2022	Southeast Asian Games	Hanoi, Vietnam	
71 kg
Snatch	105 kg	Phạm Thị Hồng Thanh	7 April 2024	World Cup	Phuket, Thailand	
Clean & Jerk	130 kg	Phạm Thị Hồng Thanh	13 September 2023	World Championships	Riyadh, Saudi Arabia	
Total	234 kg	Phạm Thị Hồng Thanh	13 September 2023	World Championships	Riyadh, Saudi Arabia	
76 kg
Snatch						
Clean & Jerk						
Total						
81 kg
Snatch						
Clean & Jerk						
Total						
87 kg
Snatch						
Clean & Jerk						
Total						
+87 kg
Snatch	98 kg	Trần Thị Hiền	13 May 2023	Asian Championships	Jinju, South Korea	
Clean & Jerk	125 kg	Trần Thị Hiền	13 May 2023	Asian Championships	Jinju, South Korea	
Total	223 kg	Trần Thị Hiền	13 May 2023	Asian Championships	Jinju, South Korea	

=== Men (1998–2018) ===
Event	Record	Athlete	Date	Meet	Place	Ref
56 kg
Snatch	135 kg	Thạch Kim Tuấn	8 November 2014	World Championships	Almaty, Kazakhstan	
Clean & Jerk	161 kg	Thạch Kim Tuấn	8 November 2014	World Championships	Almaty, Kazakhstan	
Total	296 kg	Thạch Kim Tuấn	8 November 2014	World Championships	Almaty, Kazakhstan	
62 kg
Snatch	136 kg	Trinh Van Vinh	19 September 2017	Asian Indoor and Martial Arts Games	Ashgabat, Turkmenistan	
Clean & Jerk	166 kg	Trinh Van Vinh	19 September 2017	Asian Indoor and Martial Arts Games	Ashgabat, Turkmenistan	
Total	302 kg	Trinh Van Vinh	19 September 2017	Asian Indoor and Martial Arts Games	Ashgabat, Turkmenistan	
69 kg
Snatch						
Clean & Jerk						
Total						
77 kg
Snatch						
Clean & Jerk						
Total						
85 kg
Snatch						
Clean & Jerk						
Total						
94 kg
Snatch						
Clean & Jerk						
Total						
105 kg
Snatch						
Clean & Jerk						
Total						
+105 kg
Snatch						
Clean & Jerk						
Total						
