= List of Laotian records in Olympic weightlifting =

The following are the national records in Olympic weightlifting in Laos. Records are maintained in each weight class for the snatch lift, clean and jerk lift, and the total for both lifts by the Lao Weightlifting Federation.

== Current records ==
=== Men ===
Event	Record	Athlete	Date	Meet	Place	Ref
60 kg
Snatch	85 kg	Nasod Thy	13 December 2025	SEA Games	Chonburi, Thailand	
Clean & Jerk	100 kg	Nasod Thy	13 December 2025	SEA Games	Chonburi, Thailand	
Total	185 kg	Nasod Thy	13 December 2025	SEA Games	Chonburi, Thailand	
65 kg
Snatch	75 kg	Tran Minh Tri	14 December 2025	SEA Games	Chonburi, Thailand	
Clean & Jerk	95 kg	Tran Minh Tri	14 December 2025	SEA Games	Chonburi, Thailand	
Total	170 kg	Tran Minh Tri	14 December 2025	SEA Games	Chonburi, Thailand	
71 kg
Snatch						
Clean & Jerk						
Total						
79 kg
Snatch						
Clean & Jerk						
Total						
88 kg
Snatch						
Clean & Jerk						
Total						
94 kg
Snatch						
Clean & Jerk						
Total						
110 kg
Snatch						
Clean & Jerk						
Total						
+110 kg
Snatch						
Clean & Jerk						
Total						

=== Women ===
Event	Record	Athlete	Date	Meet	Place	Ref
48 kg
Snatch						
Clean & Jerk						
Total						
53 kg
Snatch	60 kg	Maiyia Vue	13 December 2025	SEA Games	Chonburi, Thailand	
Clean & Jerk	70 kg	Maiyia Vue	13 December 2025	SEA Games	Chonburi, Thailand	
Total	130 kg	Maiyia Vue	13 December 2025	SEA Games	Chonburi, Thailand	
58 kg
Snatch						
Clean & Jerk						
Total						
63 kg
Snatch						
Clean & Jerk						
Total						
69 kg
Snatch						
Clean & Jerk						
Total						
77 kg
Snatch						
Clean & Jerk						
Total						
86 kg
Snatch						
Clean & Jerk						
Total						
+86 kg
Snatch						
Clean & Jerk						
Total						

== Historical records ==
=== Men (2018–2025) ===
Event	Record	Athlete	Date	Meet	Place	Ref
55 kg
Snatch	95 kg	Tonesien Saechao	20 April 2019	Asian Championships	Ningbo, China	
Clean and Jerk	120 kg	Tonesien Saechao	1 December 2019	Southeast Asian Games	Manila, Philippines	
Total	215 kg	Tonesien Saechao	1 December 2019	Southeast Asian Games	Manila, Philippines	
61 kg
Snatch	85 kg	Nousit Rattakon	20 May 2022	Southeast Asian Games	Hanoi, Vietnam	
Clean & Jerk	105 kg	Khamsamouth Phethuenyao	2 December 2019	Southeast Asian Games	Manila, Philippines	
Total	182 kg	Nousit Rattakon	20 May 2022	Southeast Asian Games	Hanoi, Vietnam	
67 kg
Snatch						
Clean & Jerk						
Total						
73 kg
Snatch						
Clean and Jerk						
Total						
81 kg
Snatch						
Clean and Jerk						
Total						
89 kg
Snatch						
Clean and Jerk						
Total						
96 kg
Snatch						
Clean and Jerk						
Total						
102 kg
Snatch						
Clean and Jerk						
Total						
109 kg
Snatch						
Clean and Jerk						
Total						
+109 kg
Snatch						
Clean and Jerk						
Total						

=== Women (2018–2025) ===
Event	Record	Athlete	Date	Meet	Place	Ref
45 kg
Snatch	51 kg	Bouakham Phongsakone	13 May 2023	Southeast Asian Games	Phnom Penh, Cambodia	
Clean & Jerk	71 kg	Bouakham Phongsakone	13 May 2023	Southeast Asian Games	Phnom Penh, Cambodia	
Total	122 kg	Bouakham Phongsakone	13 May 2023	Southeast Asian Games	Phnom Penh, Cambodia	
49 kg
Snatch	55 kg	Bouakham Phongsakone	1 December 2019	Southeast Asian Games	Manila, Philippines	
Clean & Jerk	70 kg	Bouakham Phongsakone	1 December 2019	Southeast Asian Games	Manila, Philippines	
Total	125 kg	Bouakham Phongsakone	1 December 2019	Southeast Asian Games	Manila, Philippines	
55 kg
Snatch	53 kg	Maiyia Vue	2 December 2019	Southeast Asian Games	Manila, Philippines	
Clean & Jerk	75 kg	Maiyia Vue	2 December 2019	Southeast Asian Games	Manila, Philippines	
Total	138 kg	Maiyia Vue	2 December 2019	Southeast Asian Games	Manila, Philippines	
59 kg
Snatch	40 kg	Kong Keomororkot	14 May 2023	Southeast Asian Games	Phnom Penh, Cambodia	
Clean & Jerk	59 kg	Kong Keomororkot	14 May 2023	Southeast Asian Games	Phnom Penh, Cambodia	
Total	99 kg	Kong Keomororkot	14 May 2023	Southeast Asian Games	Phnom Penh, Cambodia	
64 kg
Snatch						
Clean & Jerk						
Total						
71 kg
Snatch						
Clean & Jerk						
Total						
76 kg
Snatch						
Clean & Jerk						
Total						
81 kg
Snatch						
Clean & Jerk						
Total						
87 kg
Snatch						
Clean & Jerk						
Total						
+87 kg
Snatch						
Clean & Jerk						
Total						
