= Ragala Venkat Rahul =

Indian weightlifter (born 1997)

Personal information
- Nationality: Indian
- Born: 16 March 1997 (age 29) Stuartpuram, Guntur district, Andhra Pradesh, India
- Height: 1.75 m (5 ft 9 in) (2018)
- Weight: 85 kg (187 lb) (2018)

Sport
- Country: India
- Sport: Weightlifting
- Event: 85 kg
- Coached by: vijay
Medal record
Men's weightlifting
Representing India
Commonwealth Games
Gold medal – first place	2018 Gold Coast	85 kg
Commonwealth Championships
Gold medal – first place	2017 Gold Coast	85 kg
Silver medal – second place	2015 Pune	85 kg
Silver medal – second place	2019 Apia	89 kg
Youth Olympic Games
Silver medal – second place	2014 Nanjing	77 kg
Competed as an Independent Olympic Participants
Asian Youth Games
Gold medal – first place	2013 Nanjing	77 kg
- Updated on 19 January 2022

Ragala Venkat Rahul (born 16 March 1997) is an Indian weightlifter who won the gold medal in the men's 85 kg weight class at the 2018 Commonwealth Games in Gold Coast, Australia.

== Early life ==
He was born in Stuartpuram, Guntur, Andhra Pradesh. He trained at Sports School in Hyderabad.

== Career ==
At the 2014 Summer Youth Olympics in Nanjing, he won the silver medal in the 77 kg category. This was India's first ever medal in weightlifting at the Youth Olympics.

He won a gold medal in the men's 85 kg weight class at the 2018 Commonwealth Games in Gold Coast, Australia. He lifted a total of 338 kg - 151 kg in snatch and 187 kg in clean and jerk. It was the fourth gold medal for India in weightlifting at the Games.
