= 2015 Commonwealth Weightlifting Championships =

- Host city: Pune, India
- Dates: 12–16 October 2015
- Main venue: Shree Shiv Chhatrapati Sports Complex

The 2015 Commonwealth Weightlifting Championships were held at the Shree Shiv Chhatrapati Sports Complex in Pune, India from 12 to 16 October 2015.

== Medal summary ==
The following stats relate to senior results only. Junior and youth results are cited here and here respectively.

=== Medal table ===
* Host nation (India)

Rank	Nation	Gold	Silver	Bronze	Total
1	India*	7	5	2	14
2	Samoa	2	0	0	2
3	Malaysia	1	2	2	5
4	Cook Islands	1	0	0	1
4	Fiji	1	0	0	1
4	Kiribati	1	0	0	1
4	Nauru	1	0	0	1
4	Solomon Islands	1	0	0	1
9	Australia	0	2	0	2
9	Mauritius	0	2	0	2
11	Sri Lanka	0	1	5	6
12	Papua New Guinea	0	1	2	3
13	Pakistan	0	1	1	2
14	Bangladesh	0	1	0	1
15	Wales	0	0	2	2
16	Canada	0	0	1	1
Totals (16 entries)		15	15	15	45

=== Men ===
Event	Gold		Silver		Bronze	
56 kg	Sukhen Dey; India	244 kg	Jamjang Deru; India	242 kg	Azroy Hazalwafie; Malaysia	242 kg
62 kg	Deepak Lather; India	261 kg	Aznil Bidin; Malaysia	257 kg	Thilanka Palangasinghe; Sri Lanka	254 kg
69 kg (Note: Mohammad Huzairi Ramli of Malaysia, who lifted 291 kg for silver, tested positive for methamphetamine and was subsequently disqualified.)	Mohd Hafifi Mansor; Malaysia	303 kg	Indika Dissanayake; Sri Lanka	290 kg	Papul Changmai; India	289 kg
77 kg	Sathish Sivalingam; India	325 kg	François Etoundi; Australia	297 kg	Toua Udia; Papua New Guinea	293 kg
85 kg	Vikas Thakur; India	335 kg	Ragala Venkat Rahul; India	327 kg	Khairul Anuar Mohamad; Malaysia	307 kg
94 kg	Siaosi Leuo; Samoa	347 kg	Usman Amjad Rathore; Pakistan	317 kg	Srimal Karunarathna; Sri Lanka	298 kg
105 kg	David Katoatau; Kiribati	347 kg	Yvan Pierrot; Mauritius	325 kg	Praful Dubey; India	324 kg
+105 kg	Itte Detenamo; Nauru	375 kg	Damon Kelly; Australia	366 kg	Nooh Dastgir Butt; Pakistan	357 kg

=== Women ===
Event	Gold		Silver		Bronze	
48 kg	Khumukcham Sanjita Chanu; India	182 kg	Saikhom Mirabai Chanu; India	181 kg	Thelma Toua; Papua New Guinea	155 kg
53 kg (Note: Pramila Krisani of India, who lifted 189 kg for silver, tested positive for stanozolol and was subsequently disqualified.)	Santoshi Matsa; India	190 kg	Dika Toua; Papua New Guinea	177 kg	Chamari Warnakulasuriya; Sri Lanka	161 kg
58 kg (Note: Juliette Malvina of Seychelles and Minati Sethi of India, who lifted 197/194 kg for gold/bronze respectively, both tested positive for stanozolol and were subsequently disqualified.)	Jenly Tegu Wini; Solomon Islands	194 kg	Sumanbala Devi; India	186 kg	Christie Williams; Wales	154 kg
63 kg	Punam Yadav; India	200 kg	Mabia Aktar; Bangladesh	176 kg	Stephanie Owens; Wales	160 kg
69 kg	Apolonia Vaivai; Fiji	192 kg	Emanuella Labonne; Mauritius	184 kg	Chathurika Priyanthi; Sri Lanka	171 kg
75 kg	Mary Opeloge; Samoa	230 kg	Siti Aisyah Md Rosli; Malaysia	180 kg	Snimerdeep Sanghera; Canada	165 kg
+75 kg	Luisa Peters; Cook Islands	208 kg	Kanchan Munnolkar; India	202 kg	J. B. Haputhanna; Sri Lanka	154 kg
