= Volleyball at the Philippine National Games =

POC-PSC Philippine National Games Volleyball
- Current season, competition or edition: 2014
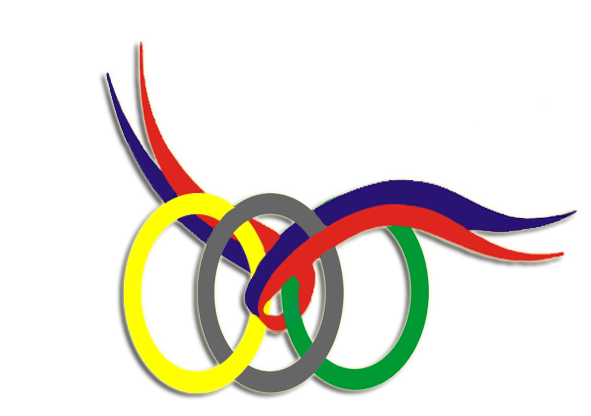
- Official Logo
- Sport: Volleyball
- Founded: 1994
- First season: Men: Women:
- No. of teams: Indoor: Men:20; Women:9; Beach: Men: Women:7
- Country: Philippines
- Continent: Asia
- Most recent champions: Indoor: Men:Philippine Air Force; Women:Philippine Air Force; Beach: Men:UST; Women:CEBU
- Most titles: Men: Indoor: Beach: Women: Indoor:Philippine Air Force(2); Beach: CEBU(2)

The POC-PSC Philippine National Games (PNG) is a multi-sport tournament in the Philippines. It includes the sport of Indoor and Beach Volleyball for both men and women. The most recent title holders were the Philippine Air Force Air Men and Women for Indoor Volleyball for both men's and women's title while University of Santo Tomas Kris Roy Guzman and Mark Gil Alfafara, and Flormel Rodriguez and Therese Ramos of CEBU won the men's and women's beach volleyball respectively.

== Results ==
=== Indoor Volleyball ===
- Men's Division

Year	Host	Final			3rd place match			Number of teams
Year	Host	Champions	Score	Runners-up	3rd place	Score	4th place	Number of teams
2011; Details	Negros Occidental
2012; Details	Dumaguete
2013; Details	Manila
2014; Details	Manila	Philippine Air Force	3-1	National University	TVM-Systema	3-1	Cagayan Valley Rising Suns	20

- Women's Division

Year	Host	Final			3rd place match			Number of teams
Year	Host	Champions	Score	Runners-up	3rd place	Score	4th place	Number of teams
2011; Details	Negros Occidental
2012; Details	Dumaguete	Bayawan		Toyota	Siliman University
2013; Details	Manila	Philippine Air Force	3-1	Cagayan Valley Bomberinas
2014; Details	Manila	Philippine Air Force	3-2	De La Salle Lady Spikers	Cagayan Valley Lady Rising Suns	3-0	University of the Philippines Lady Maroons	9
2015; Details	Manila	De La Salle Lady Spikers	3-0	CSB Lady Blazers	UP Lady Fighting Maroons		JRU Lady Heavy Bombers	19

=== Beach Volleyball ===
- Men's Division

Year	Host	Finals			3rd place match			Number of teams
Year	Host	Champions	Score	Runners-up	3rd place	Score	4th place	Number of teams
2011; Details	Negros Occidental
2012; Details	Dumaguete
2013; Details	Manila	Jonrey Sasing; Edward Ybanez; CEBU		Jade Becaldo; Mike Abria; Mandaue 1	Rommel Pepito; Edmar Bonono; Mandaue 2
2014; Details	Manila	Kris Roy Guzman; Mark Gil Alfafara; UST 1	2-1	Aga Tahiluddin; Halim Khan; ARMM 2	Jade Becaldo; Edward Ybanez; CEBU 1	2-0	Rommel Pepito; Edmar Bonono; CEBU 2	18

- Women's Division

Year	Host	Finals			3rd place match			Number of teams
Year	Host	Champions	Score	Runners-up	3rd place	Score	4th place	Number of teams
2011; Details	Negros Occidental
2012; Details	Dumaguete
2013; Details	Manila	Jusabelle Brillo; Apple Saraum; Cebu		Suzette Panis; Rapril Aguilar; Mandaue	Jessa Aranda; Cielo Palahang; RTU 1
2014; Details	Manila	Flormel Rodriguez; Therese Ramos; CEBU	2-0	Sisi Rondina; Rica Jane Rivera; UST 1	Bianca Cruz; Charisma Buan; UST 2	2-0	Jonafer San Pedro; Priscilla Catacutan; RTU 1	7

== See also ==
- Philippine Volleyball Federation
- Philippine Olympic Committee
- Philippine Sports Commission
