= Sultan Mizan Zainal Abidin Stadium =

Stadium in Kuala Nerus, Terengganu, Malaysia

Sultan Mizan Zainal Abidin Stadium Stadium Sultan Mizan Zainal Abidin
- Gong Badak Stadium
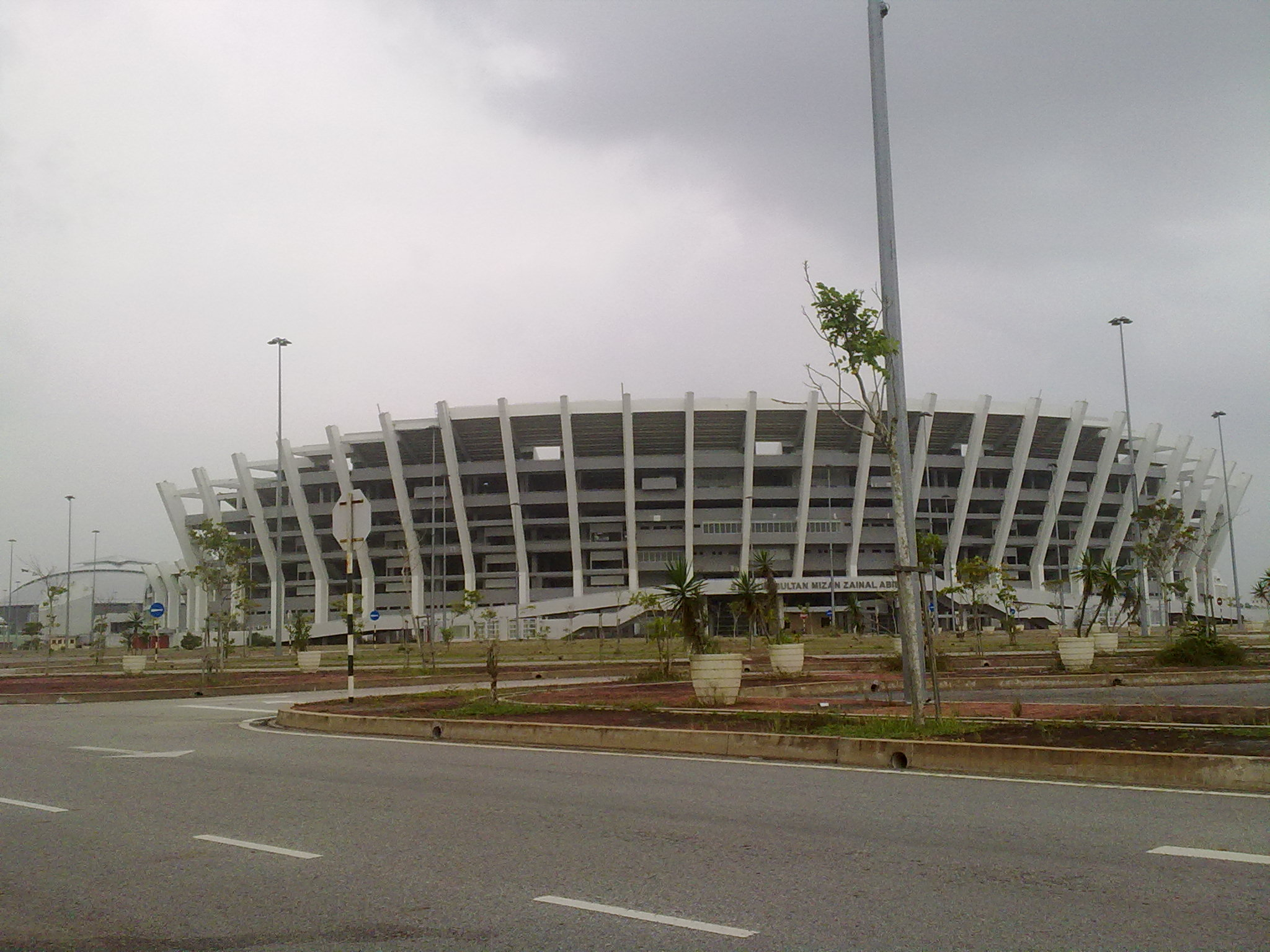
- Exterior of the stadium
- Interactive map of Sultan Mizan Zainal Abidin Stadium; Stadium Sultan Mizan Zainal Abidin
- Location: Gong Badak, Kuala Nerus, Terengganu, Malaysia
- Coordinates: 5°22′22″N 103°6′23″E
- Owner: Terengganu FC
- Capacity: 50,000
- Surface: Bermuda grass (Bermuda Princess 77)

Construction
- Built: 27 March 2005; 21 years ago
- Opened: 10 May 2008; 18 years ago
- Renovated: 2009, 2014-2015, 2018-2020
- Cost: MYR 270 million

Tenants
- Terengganu FC (2008–2009, 2015–2016, 2020–present); Malaysia national football team (selected matches)

The Sultan Mizan Zainal Abidin Stadium (SSMZA, Malay: Stadium Sultan Mizan Zainal Abidin) is a football stadium in Kuala Nerus, Terengganu, Malaysia. Together with the adjacent Mini Stadium, it forms the centrepiece of Terengganu Sports Complex. It was used for football matches. Its namesake is the reigning ruler of Terengganu, Sultan Mizan Zainal Abidin. The biggest stadium in the east coast region of Peninsular Malaysia and second largest in the country, it holds a capacity of 50,000 spectators. It was built to replace Sultan Ismail Nasiruddin Shah Stadium as the state's main stadium.

It is the current home ground of Terengganu.

== History ==
Sultan Mizan Zainal Abidin Stadium was officially opened by the current Sultan of Terengganu, Sultan Mizan Zainal Abidin whom was also himself by then the 13th Yang di-Pertuan Agong on 10 May 2008. Its first major use was for the main venue of the 12th edition of Sukma Games, the 2008 Sukma Games.

=== First collapse of the roof ===
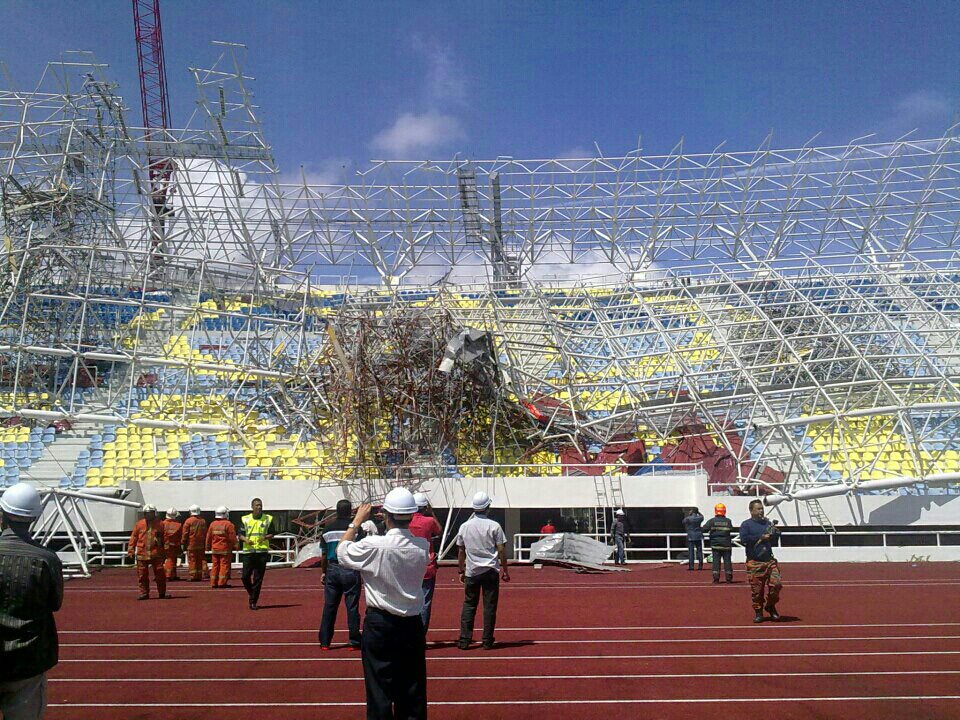
The collapse of Sultan Mizan Zainal Abidin Stadium

On 2 June 2009, a major part of the roof construction collapsed under normal weather conditions, including the section above the royal box. It was only about a year after the stadium was officially opened. Witness accounts indicated that a long loud sound similar to a jet engine noise was heard as the roof fell to earth in pieces. A number of staff were in the stadium during the collapse, with preparations for varsity staff games being made. In addition to the games getting cancelled, many pieces of equipment were either damaged or destroyed and vehicles parked nearby being damaged. Fortunately, no casualties were reported.

The major cause for the collapse of the roof was identified to be the design fault and inappropriate materials. There were also reports of sporadic loud bangs and structure damage prior to the collapse. One of the structural repair jobs on the roof was scheduled on the day of the collapse itself, along with some electrical repair works being carried out on other part of the stadium. As of June 2010, the cleaning work and relocation of the collapsed roof were not finished.

On 19 December 2011, Terengganu Menteri Besar Ahmad Said confirmed that the stadium would be repaired by early 2012 with alterations to its roof design, mulling it to be similar with that of the Bukit Jalil National Stadium.

=== Second collapse of the roof ===
On 20 February 2013, the stadium's roof collapsed again while undergoing re-construction work which commenced in late 2012. 137 meters (two-thirds of the old structure) collapsed when working construction workers heard loud noises, followed by the collapse of steel pillars. The collapse caused injuries to 5 workers with 3 of them suffering serious injuries.

In October 2014, the stadium undergo a RM26 million repair funded by the Terengganu state government and supervised by the Public Works Department (PWD) involving 14 contractors.

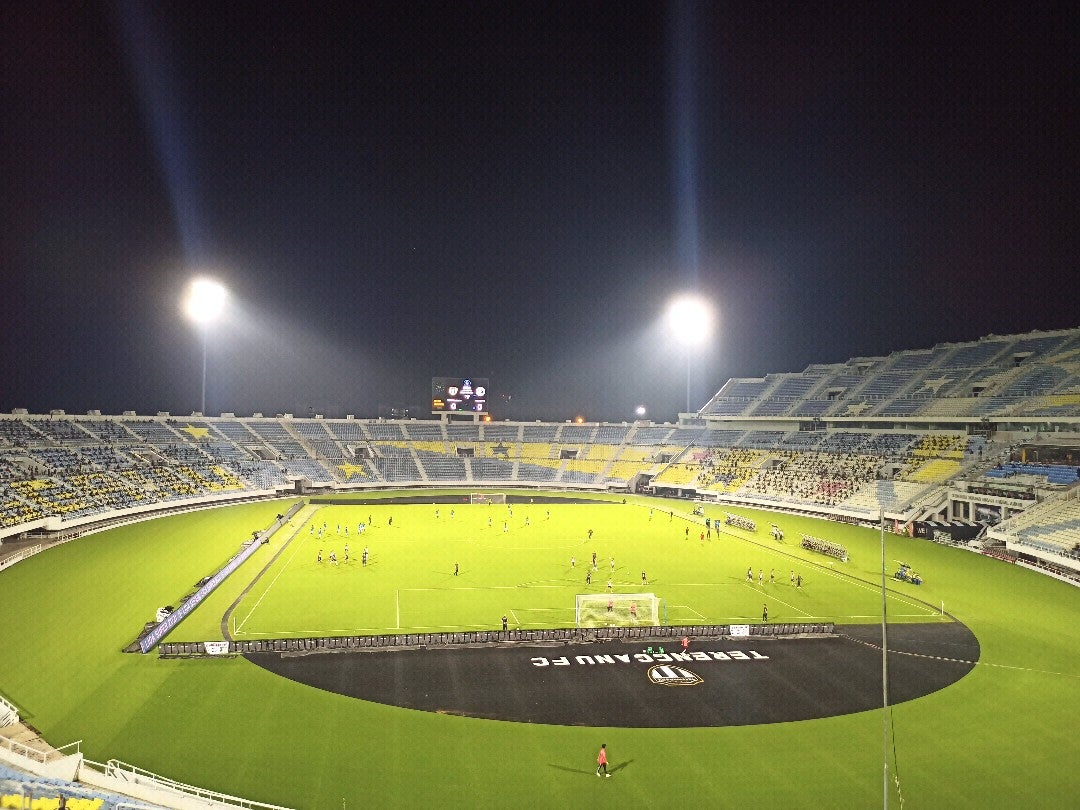
Sultan Mizan Zainal Abidin Stadium at night in 2022.

In early January 2018, the stadium roof will undergo re-construction again.

=== Upgrading the pitch ===
In April 2019, as part of the Malaysian Football League (MFL) initiative to improve the quality of Malaysian football stadiums, the stadium's pitch were upgraded through the MFL's pilot project to restore field quality. The stadium pitch is now being carpeted with Bermuda grass and the re-turfing cost RM1 million, sponsored by MFL.

On 1 February 2020, the damaged running track cause by the collapse of the roof will be replaced with artificial grass and will look exactly like the Tan Sri Dato' Haji Hassan Yunos Stadium. As a result of this, the stadium will be dedicated for football use only.

== Events ==
- 2008 Sukma Games: Terengganu

== Politics ==
The stadium's fate was overseen by the opposition as a part of the administration by the former Barisan Nasional government led by then Menteri Besar Idris Jusoh. Idris was removed from Wisma Darul Iman following a fallout with the Terengganu Palace shortly after the 2008 general elections, an event that formed the background of the 2008 Terengganu constitutional crisis. As a result, his replacement Ahmad Said's earliest duty was to attend the officiating of the stadium.

== International fixtures ==
Date	Competition	Team	Score	Team
14 June 2023	Friendly	Malaysia	4–1	Solomon Islands
20 June 2023	Friendly	Malaysia	10–0	Papua New Guinea

== See also ==
- Sport in Malaysia
- List of stadiums in Malaysia
