= 2014 Philippine National Games =

2014 POC-PSC Games
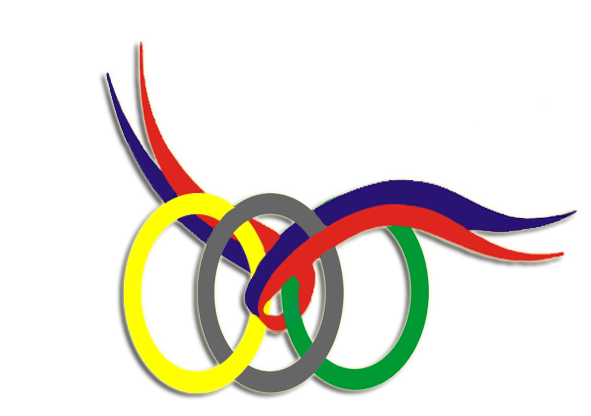
- Host city: Metro Manila
- Country: Philippines
- Athletes: 5,000
- Events: 48
- Opening: May 15, 2014
- Closing: May 25, 2014
- Main venue: Ninoy Aquino Stadium

The 2014 Philippine National Games was held in Metro Manila, Philippines from May 16–25, 2014. The opening ceremony was held at the Ninoy Aquino Stadium in Manila on May 15, 2014.

== Sports ==
- Archery (Guidelines, Results)
- Arnis (Guidelines, Results)
- Athletics (Guidelines, Results)
- Badminton (Guidelines, Results)
- Baseball (Guidelines, Results)
- Basketball (Guidelines, Results)
- Billiards(Guidelines, Results)
- Boccia (Guidelines, Results)
- Bowling (Guidelines, Results)
- Boxing (Guidelines, Results)
- Bridge (Guidelines, Results)
- Canoe (Kayak/Dragon boat)(Guidelines, Results)
- Chess (Guidelines, Results)
- Cheerleading (Guidelines, Results)
- Cycling (Guidelines, Results)
- Dancesport (Guidelines, Results)
- Diving (Guidelines, Results)
- Fencing (Guidelines, Results)
- Football (Guidelines, Results)
- Futsal (Guidelines, Results)
- Goalball (Guidelines, Results)
- Gymnastics (Guidelines, Results)
- Golf (Guidelines, Results)
- Judo (Guidelines, Results)
- Karate (Guidelines, Results)
- Lawn tennis (Guidelines, Results)
- Motocross (Guidelines, Results)
- Muay Thai (Guidelines, Results)
- Pencak silat (Guidelines, Results)
- Powerlifting (Guidelines, Results)
- Rugby (Guidelines, Results)
- Sailing (Guidelines, Results)
- Sepak takraw (Guidelines, Results)
- Shooting (Guidelines, Results)
- Softball (Guidelines, Results)
- Soft tennis (Guidelines, Results)
- Swimming (Guidelines, Results)
- Table tennis (Guidelines, Results)
- Taekwondo (Guidelines, Results)
- Triathlon (Guidelines, Results)
- Volleyball (Guidelines, Results, Details))
  - Beach volleyball (Guidelines)
- Wall climbing (Guidelines, Results)
- Water polo (Guidelines, Results)
- Weightlifting (Guidelines, Results)
- Windsurfing (Guidelines, Results)
- Wrestling (Guidelines, Results)
- Wushu (Guidelines, Results)
