= Mohamad Fazrul Azrie =

Malaysian weightlifter (born 1995)

Personal information
- Full name: Mohamad Fazrul Azrie Mohdad
- Born: 27 August 1995 (age 30) Johor, Malaysia
- Height: 170 cm (5 ft 7 in)
- Weight: 85 kg (187 lb)

Sport
- Sport: weightlifting
- Event: men's 85kg
Medal record
Men's weightlifting
Representing Malaysia
Commonwealth Games
Bronze medal – third place	2018 Gold Coast	85 kg
Southeast Asian Games
Silver medal – second place	2017 Kuala Lumpur	85 kg
Commonwealth Championships
Bronze medal – third place	2016 Penang	77 kg

Mohamad Fazrul Azrie Mohdad (born 27 August 1995), also known as Mohamad Fazrul Azrie, is a Malaysian male weightlifter and a national record holder for Malaysia in weightlifting.

He claimed his first Commonwealth Games medal at his maiden Commonwealth Games appearance during the 2018 Commonwealth Games after winning the bronze medal in the men's 85kg event. He also dedicated and presented the bronze medal achievement to his mother, who turned 46 years of age when he achieved the bronze medal.
