= Aznil Bidin =

Malaysian weightlifter (born 1994)

Personal information
- Full name: Muhamad Aznil bin Bidin
- Born: 4 June 1994 (age 32) Kedah, Malaysia
- Height: 1.63 m (5 ft 4 in)

Sport
- Country: Malaysia
- Sport: Weightlifting
- Event: 65 kg
Medal record
Men's weightlifting
Representing Malaysia
Commonwealth Games
Gold medal – first place	2018 Gold Coast	62 kg
Gold medal – first place	2022 Birmingham	61 kg
Gold medal – first place	2026 Glasgow	65 kg
Commonwealth Championships
Gold medal – first place	2021 Tashkent	61 kg
Silver medal – second place	2015 Pune	62 kg
SEA Games
Silver medal – second place	2021 Hanoi	61 kg
Silver medal – second place	2025 Bangkok	65 kg
Bronze medal – third place	2019 Philippines	61 kg

Muhamad Aznil bin Bidin (born 4 June 1994), is a Malaysian weightlifter. He is a three time gold medalist at the Commonwealth Games.

== Major results ==
Year	Venue	Weight	Snatch (kg)				Clean & Jerk (kg)				Total	Rank
Year	Venue	Weight	1	2	3	Rank	1	2	3	Rank	Total	Rank
World Championships
2019	Pattaya, Thailand	61 kg	~~125~~	125	~~128~~	12	~~160~~	160	~~163~~	7	285	8
2021	Tashkent, Uzbekistan	61 kg	~~120~~	120	~~125~~	8	~~149~~	149	153	5	273	5
2023	Riyadh, Saudi Arabia	61 kg	~~125~~	125	129	12	155	161	~~163~~	11	290	11
2024	Manama, Bahrain	67 kg	~~130~~	133	137	8	~~165~~	166	171	6	308	7
2025	Førde, Norway	65 kg	130	135	~~139~~	6	166	~~171~~	~~171~~	6	301	5
Asian Championships
2022	Manama,Bahrain	67 kg	125	130	~~135~~	5	155	161	~~167~~	5	291	5
2023	Jinju, South Korea	61 kg	~~127~~	~~128~~	~~128~~	—	157	163	~~166~~	6	—	—
2026	Ghandinagar,India	65 kg	130	~~134~~	~~136~~	7	170	~~174~~	~~174~~	5	300	5
