= 2008 Sukma Games =

Multi-sport event in Terengganu, Malaysia

XII Sukma Games
- Host city: Terengganu
- Teams: 15
- Athletes: 6000
- Events: 31 sports
- Opening: 31 May
- Closing: 9 June
- Opened by: Mizan Zainal Abidin; Yang di-Pertuan Agong
- Main venue: Sultan Mizan Zainal Abidin Stadium
- Website: 2008 Sukma Games

The 2008 Sukma Games, officially known as the 12th Sukma Games, was a Malaysian multi-sport event held in Terengganu from 31 May to 9 June 2008. Selangorian swimmer Foo Jian Beng and Sabahan swimmer Marellyn Lammert Liew were announced as the Best Sportsman and Best Sportswoman of the event, respectively.

== Development and preparation ==
The 12th Sukma Games Organising Committee was formed to oversee the staging of the event.

=== Venues ===
The 2008 Sukma Games used a mix of new and existing venues. Some venues were existing public-sporting facilities, while others were newly constructed venues. Some retrofitting work was done at venues which were more than a decade old. They reverted to public use after the games.

At the centrepiece of the activities was the newly built Gong Badak Sports Complex. Incorporating the 50,000-seat Sultan Mizan Zainal Abidin Stadium, it hosted most of the Games events. A games village was not built, instead athletes and officials were housed in universities across Terengganu. Besides being physically near to the competition venues, it was hoped that it will add vibe to the host cities and reduce post-games costs in converting a dedicated games village to other uses.

The 12th Sukma Games had 32 venues for the Games, 18 in Kuala Terengganu, 3 each in Hulu Terengganu and Kemaman and 2 each in Besut, Dungun, Marang and Setiu.

District	Competition Venue	Sports
Kuala Terengganu	Sultan Mizan Zainal Abidin Stadium
Kuala Terengganu	Main stadium	Athletics, Football
Kuala Terengganu	Hockey field	Hockey
Kuala Terengganu	Lawn bowls field	Lawn bowls
Kuala Terengganu	Indoor stadium	Gymnastics
Kuala Terengganu	Rugby field	Rugby
Kuala Terengganu	Squash court	Squash
Kuala Terengganu	Bowling center	Bowling
Kuala Terengganu	Others
Kuala Terengganu	Stadium Sultan Ismail Nasiruddin Shah	Football
Kuala Terengganu	Batu Burok state stadium	Sepak takraw
Kuala Terengganu	Universiti Sultan Zainal Abidin	Table tennis, Archery
Kuala Terengganu	Universiti Malaysia Terengganu	Fencing
Kuala Terengganu	Terengganu Sports Council	Pencak silat
Kuala Terengganu	Gong Kuin Shooting Range	Shooting
Kuala Terengganu	Tuanku Mizan Golf & Country Resort, Kuala Ibai	Golf
Kuala Terengganu	Kuala Terengganu Municipal Council Aquatic Complex	Aquatics (Swimming, Diving)
Kuala Terengganu	Kuala Terengganu Municipal Council Tennis Complex, Padang Hiliran	Tennis
Kuala Terengganu	Terengganu Equestrian Resort Sports Complex	Netball, Equestrian (Show Jumping and Dressage)
Kuala Terengganu	Terengganu Technical High School	Wushu
Hulu Terengganu	Hulu Terengganu	Cycling (Road cycling)
Hulu Terengganu	MTB Pengkalan Gawi, Tasik Kenyir	Cycling (Mountain Bike)
Hulu Terengganu	Kuala Berang	Cycling (Criterium)
Kemaman	Berlian Utama Hall, Kemaman Municipal Council	Badminton
Kemaman	Dato’ Seri Amar Diraja Hall, Kemaman Municipal Council	Volleyball (Indoor)
Kemaman	Monica Bay, Teluk Mak Nik	Volleyball (Beech)
Besut	Rakan Muda Besut	Boxing
Besut	Sultan Mizan Education Institute, Kota Putra	Judo
Dungun	Padu Arena, Jalan Kelab	Petanque
Dungun	Puteri Lake recreational lake, Bukit Besi	Canoeing
Marang	National Youth Skills Institute	Karate, Taekwondo
Marang	East Multimedia College, Rusilla, Marang	Weightlifting
Setiu	Terengganu International Endurance Park, Lembah Bidong	Equestrian (Endurance)
Setiu	Rhu Sepuloh Beech	Sailing

Demonstration sports

- Sultan Mahmud Science High School – Kabaddi
- Kuala Ibai – Formula Future

== Marketing ==
Si Diman, the clownfish, The official mascot of the games.

=== Logo ===
The logo of the 2008 Sukma Games is an image of a 'T' letter, which is the initial of the host state of the Sukma Games, Terengganu. The logo consists of four colors which are black, red, blue and yellow. Black represents Terengganu, the host state of the 2008 Sukma Games, Red represents the fighting spirit of the athletes in achieving victory, Blue represents unity and Terengganu as a coastal state and yellow represents the people involved in the 2008 Sukma Games and Terengganu as a constitutional monarchy state.

=== Mascot ===
The official mascot of the 2008 Sukma Games is an Ocellaris Clownfish named Si Diman. It is said that the clownfish is a bisexual fish found in the waters of the islands off the coast of Terengganu. The adoption of the clownfish as the games' mascot is to relate its active and aggressive characters to that of the athletes participated at the games. The smile on the mascot's face represents the joy the games bring to the people. The mascot's name Diman is an abbreviation of the honorific host state of the games, Terengganu, Darul Iman which means Abode of Faith.

=== Songs ===
The theme song of the games is "Sukma Dua Belas Terengganu 2008" (The 12th Sukma Games Terengganu 2008).

== The games ==
=== Participating states ===
- Johor (460 athletes)
- Kedah (484 athletes)
- Kelantan (285 athletes)
- Malacca
- Negeri Sembilan (336 athletes)
- Pahang (445 athletes)
- Penang
- Perak (544 athletes)
- Perlis (252 athletes)
- Sabah
- Sarawak
- Selangor
- Terengganu
- Federal Territory
- Brunei (60 athletes)

=== Sports ===
- Aquatic
  - Diving
  - Swimming
- Archery
- Athletics
- Badminton
- Bowling
- Boxing
- Canoeing
- Cycling
- Equestrian
- Fencing
- Football
- Golf
- Gymnastics
- Hockey
- Judo
- Karate
- Lawn bowls
- Netball
- Pencak silat
- Petanque
- Rugby sevens
- Sailing
- Sepak takraw
- Shooting
- Squash
- Table tennis
- Taekwondo
- Tennis
- Wushu
- Volleyball
- Weightlifting

Demonstration sport

- Kabaddi
- Formula future

=== Medal table ===
* Host nation (Terengganu)

2008 Sukma Games medal table
Rank	State	Gold	Silver	Bronze	Total
1	Terengganu*	61	39	47	147
2	Selangor	54	47	51	152
3	Sarawak	52	52	42	146
4	Pahang	31	29	24	84
5	Federal Territory	29	38	58	125
6	Perak	29	27	39	95
7	Kedah	29	27	37	93
8	Penang	27	31	47	105
9	Johor	27	31	40	98
10	Malacca	23	22	27	72
11	Sabah	21	20	31	72
12	Negeri Sembilan	11	21	35	67
13	Kelantan	8	9	18	35
14	Perlis	4	6	8	18
15	Brunei	0	2	0	2
Totals (15 entries)		406	401	504	1,311

== Broadcasting ==
Radio Televisyen Malaysia was responsible for live streaming of several events, opening and closing ceremony of the games.

Preceded by Kedah	Sukma Games; Terengganu; XII Sukma Games (2008)	Succeeded by Malacca
