= Weightlifting at the 2018 Commonwealth Games – Men's 85 kg =

Weightlifting – Men's 85 kg at the 2018 Commonwealth Games
- Venue: Carrara Sports and Leisure Centre
- Dates: 7 April 2018
- Competitors: 15 from 15 nations
- Winning total weight: 338

Medalists
gold medal	Ragala Venkat Rahul	India
silver medal	Don Opeloge	Samoa
bronze medal	Mohamad Fazrul Azrie Mohdad	Malaysia

The Men's 85 kg weightlifting event at the 2018 Commonwealth Games took place at the Carrara Sports and Leisure Centre on 7 April 2018. The weightlifter from India won the gold, with a combined lift of 338 kg.

== Records ==
Prior to this competition, the existing world, Commonwealth and Games records were as follows:

World record	Snatch	Andrei Rybakou (BLR)	187 kg	Chiang Mai, Thailand	22 September 2007
World record	Clean & Jerk	Kianoush Rostami (IRI)	220 kg	Tehran, Iran	31 May 2016
World record	Total	Kianoush Rostami (IRI)	396 kg	Rio de Janeiro, Brazil	12 August 2016
Commonwealth record	Snatch	Sergo Chakhoyan (AUS)	182 kg	Moscow, Russia	27 September 2003
Commonwealth record	Clean & Jerk	Sergo Chakhoyan (AUS)	210 kg	Moscow, Russia	27 September 2003
Commonwealth record	Total	Sergo Chakhoyan (AUS)	392 kg	Moscow, Russia	27 September 2003
Games record	Snatch	Stephen Ward (ENG)	157 kg	Kuala Lumpur, Malaysia	18 September 1998
Games record	Clean & Jerk	Shujauddin Malik (PAK)	193 kg	Melbourne, Australia	20 March 2006
Games record	Total	Leon Griffin (ENG)	347.5 kg	Kuala Lumpur, Malaysia	18 September 1998

== Schedule ==
All times are Australian Eastern Standard Time (UTC+10)

Date	Time	Round
Saturday, 7 April 2018	18:42	Final

== Results ==
Rank	Athlete	Body weight (kg)	Snatch (kg)				Clean & Jerk (kg)				Total
Rank	Athlete	Body weight (kg)	1	2	3	Result	1	2	3	Result	Total
1st place, gold medalist(s)	Ragala Venkat Rahul (IND)	84.64	147	~~151~~	151	151	182	187	~~191~~	187	338
2nd place, silver medalist(s)	Don Opeloge (SAM)	84.28	144	148	151	151	180	~~188~~	~~191~~	180	331
3rd place, bronze medalist(s)	Mohamad Fazrul Azrie Mohdad (MAS)	83.61	145	~~150~~	~~150~~	145	175	181	183	183	328
4	Donald Keyimeh Nkoh (CMR)	84.86	~~140~~	140	~~143~~	140	180	186	~~189~~	186	326
5	Michael Anyalewechi (NGR)	83.57	141	145	147	147	176	~~177~~	177	177	324
6	Christian Amoah (GHA)	84.20	~~140~~	140	145	145	170	~~175~~	176	176	321
7	Taniela Rainibogi (FIJ)	84.71	140	~~145~~	~~145~~	140	~~173~~	173	~~189~~	173	313
8	Mathieu Marineau (CAN)	84.52	134	138	~~141~~	138	168	174	~~182~~	174	312
9	Boris Elesin (AUS)	84.64	140	~~145~~	~~145~~	140	156	161	~~162~~	161	301
10	Alex Collier (ENG)	84.18	125	~~125~~	130	130	153	156	160	160	290
11	Tom-Jaye Waibeiya (NRU)	83.77	~~120~~	120	~~126~~	120	165	170	~~175~~	170	290
12	David Gorosi (SOL)	84.83	115	~~120~~	~~120~~	115	~~150~~	150	~~153~~	150	265
13	John Cheah En Wei (SGP)	84.71	115	~~120~~	~~120~~	115	140	143	~~147~~	143	258
	Harry Misangyi (WAL)	83.66	110	115	~~120~~	115	-	-	-	–	DNF
	Richard Patterson (NZL)	84.71	~~143~~	~~143~~	~~143~~	—					DNF
