= Weightlifting at the 2013 SEA Games – Women's 69 kg =

The Women's 69 kg event at the 2013 SEA Games took place on 16 December 2013 at Thein Phyu Stadium.

== Schedule ==
All times are Myanmar Standard Time (UTC+06:30)

Date	Time	Event
Monday, 16 December 2013	14:00	Final

== Results ==
Rank	Athlete	Group	Body weight	Snatch (kg)				Clean & Jerk (kg)				Total
Rank	Athlete	Group	Body weight	1	2	3	Result	1	2	3	Result	Total
1st place, gold medalist(s)	Boonatee Klkasikit (THA)	A	67.90	~~95~~	95	100	100	113	121	125	125	225
2nd place, silver medalist(s)	Lae Lae Win (MYA)	A	67.95	87	93	~~98~~	93	113	~~121~~	~~121~~	113	209
3rd place, bronze medalist(s)	Nor Khasida Abdul Halim (MAS)	A	68.55	73	77	83	83	95	105	~~107~~	105	188
