= 2010 Sukma Games =

Multi-sport event in Malacca, Malaysia

XIII Sukma Games
- Host city: Malacca
- Motto: Harmoni dan Cemerlang (Harmony and Excellence)
- Teams: 15
- Athletes: 9237
- Events: 33 sports
- Opening: 12 June
- Closing: 19 June
- Opened by: Mohd Khalil Yaakob; Yang di-Pertua Negeri of Malacca
- Main venue: Hang Jebat Stadium
- Website: 2010 Sukma Games

The 2010 Sukma Games, officially known as the 13th Sukma Games, was a Malaysian multi-sport event held in Malacca from 12 to 19 June 2010. Host Malaccan swimmer J. Karthik and Federal Territorian swimmer Chan Kah Yan were announced as the Best Sportsman and Best Sportswoman of the event, respectively.

== Development and preparation ==
=== Venues ===
The 13th Sukma Games had 29 venues for the games. 23 in Melaka Tengah, 4 in Alor Gajah and 2 in Jasin.

District	Competition Venue	Sports
Melaka Tengah	Hang Jebat Sports Complex
Melaka Tengah	Hang Jebat Stadium	Athletics, Football, Opening and closing ceremonies
Melaka Tengah	Hang Jebat Aquatic Centre	Aquatics (Diving, Swimming)
Melaka Tengah	Squash Stadium	Squash
Melaka Tengah	Equestrian Centre	Equestrian
Melaka Tengah	Lawn bowls Complex	Lawn bowls
Melaka Tengah	Melaka International Trade Centre
Melaka Tengah	Hall A	Pencak silat
Melaka Tengah	Hall B	Sepak takraw
Melaka Tengah	Hall C	Netball
Melaka Tengah	Other
Melaka Tengah	Historical Malacca City Council Sports Complex	Shooting
Melaka Tengah	Bistari Mini Stadium Ayer Keroh	Badminton
Melaka Tengah	Hang Tuah Stadium	Football
Melaka Tengah	Tun Fatimah Stadium	Football
Melaka Tengah	Melaka International Bowling Centre, Hang Tuah Jaya	Bowling
Melaka Tengah	Puteri Beach, Tanjung Kling	Volleyball (Beach)
Melaka Tengah	Ayer Keroh High School	Weightlifting
Melaka Tengah	Ayer Keroh Golf Club	Golf
Melaka Tengah	Batu Berendam Sports Complex	Fencing, Judo, Kabaddi
Melaka Tengah	Hang Jebat Sailing Centre	Sailing
Melaka Tengah	Kampung Gelam Petanque Court, Tanjong Gelam	Petanque
Melaka Tengah	Bukit Serindit	Cycling
Melaka Tengah	Hang Tuah Jaya Tennis Court	Tennis
Melaka Tengah	Bukit Serindit Historical Malacca City Council Hall	Basketball
Melaka Tengah	Historical Malacca City Council Hockey Stadium	Hockey
Alor Gajah	Universiti Teknikal Malaysia Melaka	Football, Archery, Table tennis, Wushu
Alor Gajah	University College of Islam Melaka	Volleyball (Indoor)
Alor Gajah	National Youth Skills Institute	Karate, Silambam
Alor Gajah	Durian Tunggal Reservoir	Canoeing
Jasin	Merlimau Polytechnic	Gymnastics, Rugby
Jasin	Alamanda Hall	Boxing

== Marketing ==
=== Logo ===
Tuah, the Mousedeer, the Official Mascot of the games.

The logo of the 2010 Sukma Games is an image of a mousedeer, the state animal of Malacca. The colours of Red, Yellow, Blue and White represent Malacca, the host state of the games. The mousedeer's jumping movement represents the athletes' activeness and fitness. The red and blue lines that form the shape of the mousedeer represent the confidence of the organiser in hosting the games and the rousing atmosphere of the games. Overall, the logo's triangular pattern represents the dynamic movement of the athletes and their aspirations in reaching excellence.

=== Mascot ===
The mascot of the 2010 Sukma Games is a chevrotain (or mousedeer) named Tuah, which was named after the warrior, Hang Tuah of the Malacca Sultanate. The mascot's name Tuah also means luck in Malay, which represents the luckiness of Malacca as the host of the 2010 Sukma Games. It is said the mousedeer is the state animal of Malacca, an extant species are found in forests in Southeast Asia. According to Malay folktale, it is an animal that eliminates Parameswara's hunting dog down the river of Malacca nearby the tree where he shed while just fled from Palembang, Srivijaya after the Srivijaya Kingdom's fall. The adoption of the mousedeer as the games' mascot is to relate its agility, bravery and the intelligence character to that of the athletes participating at the games.

== The games ==
=== Participating states ===
- Johor (546 athletes)
- Kedah (536 athletes)
- Kelantan (284 athletes)
- Malacca (host) (662 athletes)
- Negeri Sembilan (496 athletes)
- Pahang (500 athletes)
- Penang (435 athletes)
- Perak (601 athletes)
- Perlis (197 athletes)
- Sabah (510 athletes)
- Sarawak (650 athletes)
- Selangor (638 athletes)
- Terengganu (625 athletes)
- Federal Territory (629 athletes)
- Brunei (110 athletes)

=== Sports ===
- Aquatic
  - Diving
  - Swimming
- Archery
- Athletics
- Badminton
- Basketball
- Bowling
- Boxing
- Canoeing
- Cycling
- Equestrian
- Fencing
- Football
- Golf
- Gymnastics
- Hockey
- Judo
- Karate
- Kabaddi
- Lawn bowls
- Netball
- Pencak silat
- Petanque
- Rugby union
- Sailing
- Sepak takraw
- Shooting
- Silambam
- Squash
- Table tennis
- Taekwondo
- Tennis
- Wushu
- Volleyball

=== Medal table ===
* Host nation (Host state (Malacca))

Rank	Nation	Gold	Silver	Bronze	Total
1	Terengganu	47	30	43	120
2	Selangor	43	43	58	144
3	Federal Territories	43	42	49	134
4	Johor	40	39	53	132
5	Kedah	39	19	31	89
6	Sarawak	33	49	47	129
7	Malacca*	32	31	28	91
8	Pahang	32	29	28	89
9	Negeri Sembilan	30	26	41	97
10	Penang	29	34	39	102
11	Perak	26	32	47	105
12	Sabah	22	33	40	95
13	Kelantan	14	12	19	45
14	Perlis	6	13	11	30
15	Brunei	1	0	7	8
Totals (15 entries)		437	432	541	1,410

== Related events ==
=== Paralimpiad Malaysia ===
Logo

Mascot

The 15th Paralimpiad Malaysia was held in Malacca from 21 to 26 November.

District	Competition Venue	Sports
Melaka Tengah	Hang Jebat Stadium	Athletics, Swimming, Lawn bowls, Goalball
Melaka Tengah	Bistari Mini Stadium, Ayer Keroh	Boccia
Melaka Tengah	Melaka International Bowling Centre, Hang Tuah Jaya	Bowling
Melaka Tengah	Hang Tuah Jaya Tennis Complex	Wheelchair Tennis
Melaka Tengah	Historical Melaka City Council Basketball Court	Wheelchair Basketball
Melaka Tengah	Youth and Sports complex, Ayer Keroh	Futsal, Powerlifting
Melaka Tengah	Melaka Marina and Harbour	Sailing
Melaka Tengah	Bukit Serindit Municipal Park	Cycling
Melaka Tengah	Seri Kota High School, Ayer Leleh	Table tennis
Melaka Tengah	Historical Melaka City Council Bestari Hall	Badminton
Melaka Tengah	Hang Jebat Petanque Arena, Kampung Gelam	Petanque
Alor Gajah	Universiti Teknologi MARA	Chess

* Host nation (Malacca)

2010 Paralimpiad Malaysia medal table
Rank	State	Gold	Silver	Bronze	Total
1	Sarawak	68	91	74	233
2	Johor	52	25	26	103
3	Federal Territory	36	29	39	104
4	Selangor	25	21	26	72
5	Malacca*	20	31	29	80
6	Penang	15	20	22	57
7	Negeri Sembilan	13	9	19	41
8	Terengganu	13	8	12	33
9	Kedah	10	9	10	29
10	Sabah	9	7	7	23
11	Kelantan	8	12	14	34
12	Pahang	7	5	6	18
13	Perak	4	6	5	15
14	Labuan	3	6	5	14
15	Perlis	3	4	5	12
Totals (15 entries)		286	283	299	868

Preceded by Terengganu	Sukma Games; Malacca; XIII Sukma Games (2010)	Succeeded by Kuala Lumpur–Pahang
