= Weightlifting at the 2013 SEA Games – Women's 53 kg =

The Women's 53 kg event at the 2013 SEA Games took place on 14 December 2013 at Thein Phyu Stadium.

== Schedule ==
All times are Myanmar Standard Time (UTC+06:30)

Date	Time	Event
Saturday, 14 December 2013	14:00	Final

== Results ==
Rank	Athlete	Group	Body weight	Snatch (kg)				Clean & Jerk (kg)				Total
Rank	Athlete	Group	Body weight	1	2	3	Result	1	2	3	Result	Total
1st place, gold medalist(s)	Aye Thanda Lwin (MYA)	A	52.55	87	90	92	92	~~106~~	106	110	110	202
2nd place, silver medalist(s)	Thuy Nguyen Thi (VIE)	A	52.20	~~80~~	80	82	82	109	~~116~~	~~116~~	109	191
3rd place, bronze medalist(s)	Citra Febrianti (INA)	A	52.40	83	~~86~~	86	86	~~105~~	~~105~~	105	105	191
4	Azizah Fadzil (MAS)	A	52.70	77	~~81~~	~~81~~	77	~~95~~	95	100	100	177
