= Mohd Hafifi Mansor =

Malaysian weightlifter (born 1990)

Personal information
- Full name: Mohammad Hafifi bin Mansor
- Nickname: Hafifi
- Nationality: Malaysian
- Born: 28 October 1990 (age 35)
- Height: 162 cm (5 ft 4 in)
- Weight: 68.58 kg (151.2 lb)

Sport
- Country: Malaysia
- Sport: Weightlifting
- Event: 69 kg
Medal record
Men's weightlifting
Representing Malaysia
Commonwealth Games
Gold medal – first place	2014 Glasgow	69 kg
Bronze medal – third place	2010 New Delhi	69 kg
Commonwealth Championships
Gold medal – first place	2013 Penang	69 kg
Gold medal – first place	2015 Pune	69 kg
Gold medal – first place	2016 Penang	69 kg
Disqualified	2017 Gold Coast	69 kg
- Updated on 30 January 2022

Mohammad Hafifi bin Mansor (born 28 October 1990) is a Malaysian professional weightlifter. He won the gold medal in the men's 69 kg event at the 2014 Commonwealth Games. He also won the bronze medal at the 2010 Commonwealth Games in the 69 kg event. Tested positive for drugs in 2017.

== Major competitions ==
Year	Venue	Weight	Snatch (kg)				Clean & Jerk (kg)				Total	Rank
Year	Venue	Weight	1	2	3	Rank	1	2	3	Rank	Total	Rank
Commonwealth Games
2010	Delhi, India	69 kg	~~133~~	133	137	—N/a	165	169	~~174~~	—N/a	306	3rd place, bronze medalist(s)
