= Weightlifting at the 2013 SEA Games – Women's 58 kg =

The Women's 58 kg event at the 2013 SEA Games took place on 15 December 2013 at Thein Phyu Stadium.

== Schedule ==
All times are Myanmar Standard Time (UTC+06:30)

Date	Time	Event
Sunday, 15 December 2013	12:00	Final

== Results ==
Rank	Athlete	Group	Body weight	Snatch (kg)				Clean & Jerk (kg)				Total
Rank	Athlete	Group	Body weight	1	2	3	Result	1	2	3	Result	Total
1st place, gold medalist(s)	Sukanya Srisurat (THA)	A	57.80	95	99	102	102	115	~~123~~	123	123	225
2nd place, silver medalist(s)	Hidilyn Diaz (PHI)	A	57.70	95	99	102	102	122	~~125~~	~~125~~	122	224
3rd place, bronze medalist(s)	Thi Bich Lam (VIE)	A	57.40	83	86	89	89	105	112	~~120~~	112	201
4	Frenceay Titus (MAS)	A	57.55	77	82	~~84~~	82	95	99	~~102~~	99	181
—	Okta Dwipramita (INA)	A	57.75	~~85~~	85	~~88~~	85	~~103~~	~~103~~	~~103~~	—	DNF

== New records ==
The following records were established during the competition.

Total	224	Hidilyn Diaz (PHI)	GR
Total	225	Sukanya Srisurat (THA)	GR
