= Philippine National Games =

National multi-sport tournament of the Philippines

- Status: Active
- Genre: Multi-sport event
- Frequency: Biennial (proposed)
- Location: Various
- Country: Philippines
- Inaugurated: 1994; 32 years ago
- Organizer: Philippine Sports Commission; Philippine Olympic Committee
- Website: png.psc.gov.ph

The Philippine National Games officially known as the POC-PSC Games is a national multi-sport tournament in the Philippines. It was created as a means to determine the possible composition of national pool athletes that will compete in international tournaments such as the Southeast Asian Games, Asian Games and the Olympics.

== History ==
The Philippine National Games was created by virtue of Executive Order No. 163 dated March 3, 1994, during the term of 12th President Fidel V. Ramos.

The first edition was held in Manila in 1994, then the next edition was held two years later in the same venue. Cebu City hosted the third edition in 1997. However, the games were scrapped in 1998 due to lack of funds to organize the event. The holding of games were halted until its revival in 2011. Since then the games were held annually. Starting from the 2011 edition, the Philippine Sports Committee has been co-organizing the games with the Philippine Olympic Committee.

The 2015 edition was divided into three legs which were hosted in Luzon, Visayas and Mindanao with each leg including 10 events each for the same sports doubling as qualifiers for the 2016 edition. Starting the 2016 edition the National Games will be LGU-based. In the previous editions, athletes represented their school, club or a sponsoring group. Athletes will be able to formally represent their municipality, city or province at the games but in the finals athletes will only represent one of the four regions; Luzon, Visayas, Mindanao and National Capital Region.

The conduct of the National Games would be disrupted by the COVID-19 pandemic. The pandemic led to the cancellation of the 2020 edition.

During the 19th Congress of the Philippines, a measure seeking to institutionalize the National Games as the "government's premier national sports competition" to be held biannually has been filed. It was aimed that the National Games would become a "more comprehensive" version of the Palarong Pambansa, the government's students' national games.

Last held in 2018 since the pandemic, the National Games is set to return in 2023. With the city of Manila as the host for fifth time, it will run from December 17 to 22.

A bill to institutionalize the PNG as a bi-annual competition to complement the national sports program was filed in 2023. It also explicitly includes persons with disabilities (PWDs). However it was vetoed by president Bongbong Marcos in January 2025 citing redundancy with the Palarong Pambansa.

The recent National Games was held in 2025.

== Editions ==
Year	Main Host	Province	Region	Island group
1994	Manila	—N/a	National Capital Region	Luzon
1996	Manila	—N/a	National Capital Region	Luzon
1997	Cebu City	Cebu	Central Visayas	Visayas
2011	Bacolod	Negros Occidental	Western Visayas	Visayas
2012	Dumaguete	Negros Oriental	Central Visayas	Visayas
2013	Manila	—N/a	National Capital Region	Luzon
2014	Manila	—N/a	National Capital Region	Luzon
2016	Lingayen	Pangasinan	Ilocos Region	Luzon
2018	Cebu City	Cebu	Central Visayas	Visayas
2023	Manila	—N/a	National Capital Region	Luzon
2025	Not held			
2027	Santa Maria and Bocaue	TBA	TBA	TBA

=== Map of host cities ===
Host cities of the National Games

== Sports ==
The following are the sports contested at the National Games (as of May 2014).

Olympic sports

- Archery
- Athletics
- Badminton
- Baseball
- Basketball
- Boxing
- Canoeing
- Cycling
- Diving
- Fencing
- Football
- Golf
- Gymnastics
- Judo
- Karate
- Rugby sevens
- Sailing
- Shooting
- Softball
- Sport climbing
- Swimming
- Table tennis
- Taekwondo
- Tennis
- Triathlon
- Volleyball
  - Beach volleyball
- Water polo
- Weightlifting
- Wrestling

Other sports

- Arnis
- Billiard
- Bowling
- Bridge
- Chess
- Cheerleading
- Dancesport
- Dragon boat
- Futsal
- Motocross
- Muay Thai
- Pencak silat
- Sepak takraw
- Soft tennis
- Windsurfing
- Wushu

Paralympic sports

- Boccia
- Goalball
- Powerlifting

== See also ==
- Batang Pinoy
- Palarong Pambansa
