= Weightlifting at the 2025 SEA Games =

- Venue: Olympic Gymnasium, Chonburi Sports School
- Location: Mueang Chonburi, Chonburi, Thailand
- Dates: 13-17 December 2025

Weightlifting competitions at the 2025 SEA Games took place at SEA Games Gymnasium, Chonburi Sports School in Mueang Chonburi, Chonburi from 13 to 17 December 2025.

== Medal table ==
* Host nation (Thailand)

Rank	Nation	Gold	Silver	Bronze	Total
1	Thailand*	9	2	3	14
2	Indonesia	3	4	1	8
3	Vietnam	1	4	6	11
4	Philippines	1	1	1	3
5	Malaysia	0	3	2	5
6	Myanmar	0	0	1	1
Totals (6 entries)		14	14	14	42

== Medalists ==
=== Men ===
Event	Gold		Silver		Bronze	
60 kg	Theerapong Silachai; Thailand	304	Ricko Saputra; Indonesia	295	K'Dương; Vietnam	289
65 kg	Patsaphong Thongsuk; Thailand	307	Muhamad Aznil Bidin; Malaysia	306	Eko Yuli Irawan; Indonesia	304
71 kg	Weeraphon Wichuma; Thailand	347 WR	Albert Delos Santos; Philippines	324	Nguyễn Đức Toàn; Vietnam	305
79 kg	Rizki Juniansyah; Indonesia	365 WR	Muhammad Erry Hidayat; Malaysia	336	Natthawut Suepsuan; Thailand	335
88 kg	Rahmat Erwin Abdullah; Indonesia	362	Nguyễn Quốc Toàn; Vietnam	361	Worrapot Nasuriwong; Thailand	341
94 kg	Sarat Sumpradit; Thailand	366	Mohamad Syahmi Nor Ghazali; Malaysia	353	Trần Xuân Dũng; Vietnam	337
+94 kg	Trần Đình Thắng; Vietnam	366	Rungsuriya Yothaphon; Thailand	365	Muhammad Faris Haikal Kamarul; Malaysia	335

=== Women ===
Event	Gold		Silver		Bronze	
48 kg	Luluk Diana Tri Wijayana; Indonesia	184	Thanyathon Sukcharoen; Thailand	183	Nguyễn Thị Thu Trang; Vietnam	181
53 kg	Surodchana Khambao; Thailand	204	Nguyễn Hoài Hương; Vietnam	197	Yar Naw Ta Boe; Myanmar	191
58 kg	Suratwadee Yodsarn; Thailand	224	Natasya Beteyob; Indonesia	218	Quàng Thị Tâm; Vietnam	215
63 kg	Elreen Ando; Philippines	229	Nguyễn Thị Thủy Tiên; Vietnam	219	Thanaporn Saetia; Thailand	218
69 kg	Phattharathida Wongsing; Thailand	229	Indah Afriza; Indonesia	227	Kristel Macrohon; Philippines	221
77 kg	Chalida Taingdee; Thailand	214	Alyamaulida Kartika Pertiwi; Indonesia	206	Nguyễn Thị Phương; Vietnam	185
+77 kg	Duangaksorn Chaidee; Thailand	258	Pha Si Rô; Vietnam	245	Siti Aqilah Farhana Draman; Malaysia	240
