= 2019 Slovenia Open (table tennis) =

Tournament details
- Dates: 10–12 May 2019
- Competitors: 64S / 16D
- Total prize money: US$30,000
- Location: Otočec, Slovenia

Champions
- Men's singles: (Croatia) Wei Shihao
- Women's singles: (Hungary) Georgina Póta
- Men's doubles: (Brazil) Eric Jouti (Brazil) Gustavo Tsuboi
- Women's doubles: (Japan) Miyuu Kihara (Japan) Miyu Nagasaki

The 2019 Slovenia Open is the fifth event of the 2019 ITTF Challenge Series. It takes place from 10 to 12 May in Otočec, Slovenia.

== Men's singles ==
=== Seeds ===
1. (Austria) Daniel Habesohn (semi-finals)
2. (Germany) Ricardo Walther (first round)
3. (Brazil) Gustavo Tsuboi (second round)
4. (Greece) Panagiotis Gionis (first round)
5. (Egypt) Omar Assar (first round)
6. (Slovakia) Lubomir Pistej (quarter-finals)
7. (Portugal) Joao Monteiro (first round)
8. (Croatia) Tomislav Pucar (third round)
9. (Germany) Ruwen Filus (third round)
10. (Brazil) Eric Jouti (quarter-finals)
11. (Czech Republic) Lubomir Jancarik (first round)
12. (Poland) Jakub Dyjas (quarter-finals)
13. (Paraguay) Marcelo Aguirre (first round)
14. (Romania) Hunor Szocs (third round)
15. (Denmark) Anders Lind (third round)
16. (Belgium) Robin Devos (first round)
17. (Slovenia) Deni Kozul (second round)
18. (Croatia) Frane Kojic (first round)
19. (Hungary) Bence Majoros (first round)
20. (Austria) Andreas Levenko (first round)
21. (Hungary) Nandor Ecseki (first round)
22. (Hong Kong) Lam Siu Hang (second round)
23. (Puerto Rico) Brian Afanador (second round)
24. (Japan) Masaki Yoshida (quarter-finals)
25. (Brazil) Vitor Ishiy (second round)
26. (Nigeria) Olajide Omotayo (first round)
27. (Czech Republic) Tomas Konecny (third round)
28. (Chinese Taipei) Peng Wang-wei (second round)
29. (Poland) Marek Badowski (quarter-finals)
30. (Scotland) Gavin Rumgay (first round)
31. (Chile) Gustavo Gomez (first round)
32. (Slovenia) Peter Hribar (first round)

=== Draw ===
==== Finals ====
Semifinals
1	(Austria) Daniel Habesohn	8	11	9	9	13
(Poland) Jakub Dyjas	11	9	11	11	15
(Japan) Takuya Jin	9	11	11	11	11
(Croatia) Wei Shihao	11	6	6	9	5

Final
(Poland) Jakub Dyjas	11	11	4	11	6	4
(Croatia) Wei Shihao	13	7	11	7	11	11

==== Top half ====
===== Section 1 =====
First round
1	(Austria) D Habesohn	11	7	12	11	11
(Romania) A Manole	4	11	10	8	3
(Italy) C Rossi	5	11	11	11	10	4
25	(Brazil) V Ishiy	11	4	13	8	12	11
17	(Slovenia) D Kozul	11	12	11	7	6	11
(Croatia) T kolarek	7	10	4	11	11	5
(Iran) A Ahmadian	11	9	11	8	4	2
15	(Denmark) A Lind	8	11	7	11	11	11
11	(Czech Republic) L Jancarik	11	8	11	6	16	10
(France) A-K Salifou	8	11	7	11	18	12
(Netherlands) E Oostwouder	11	9	5	12	6	5
29	(Poland) M Badowski	7	11	11	10	11	11
32	(Slovenia) P Hribar	9	11	7	12	4
(Hong Kong) Li H M	11	8	11	14	11
(Puerto Rico) D Gonzalez	9	1	3	10
8	(Croatia) T Pucar	11	11	11	12

Second round
1	(Austria) D Habesohn	17	5	11	11	11
25	(Brazil) V Ishiy	15	11	6	6	3
17	(Slovenia) D Kozul	9	11	10	11	8	11	7
15	(Denmark) A Lind	11	9	12	9	11	9	11
(France) A-K Salifou	12	9	7	8	7
29	(Poland) M Badowski	10	11	11	11	11
(Hong Kong) Li H M	2	12	9	11	6	7
8	(Croatia) T Pucar	11	10	11	6	11	11

Third round
1	(Austria) D Habesohn	9	12	11	11	11	9	11
15	(Denmark) A Lind	11	14	8	5	8	11	9
29	(Poland) M Badowski	11	11	11	11	11
8	(Croatia) T Pucar	13	6	7	9	8

Quarterfinals
1	(Austria) D Habesohn	11	9	12	11	11
29	(Poland) M Badowski	5	11	10	9	7

===== Section 2 =====
First round
7	(Portugal) J Monteiro	11	8	11	8	11	8	11
(France) A Landrieu	4	11	9	11	9	11	13
(Argentina) G Alto	10	11	7	11	11	11
26	(Nigeria) O Omotayo	12	9	11	7	2	9
23	(Puerto Rico) B Afanador	11	11	12	12
(Spain) J Masip	7	5	10	10
(France) B Rembert	9	14	7	11	6
12	(Poland) J Dyjas	11	16	11	8	11
16	(Belgium) R Devos	13	6	8	14	11	11	9
(France) S Ouaiche	11	11	11	16	6	8	11
(Moldova) A Putuntica	11	11	10	11	7	7	11
31	(Chile) G Gomez	5	8	12	9	11	11	9
24	(Japan) M Yoshida	11	14	11	12	11
(France) J Rolland	5	16	7	10	7
(Japan) Y Matsuyama	10	11	11	7	10	5
3	(Brazil) G Tsuboi	12	9	4	11	12	11

Second round
(France) A Landrieu	9	11	12	8	11	11
(Argentina) G Alto	11	2	10	11	7	5
23	(Puerto Rico) B Afanador	11	7	7	9
12	(Poland) J Dyjas	13	11	11	11
(France) S Ouaiche	19	11	14	9	10	9	11
(Moldova) A Putuntica	17	8	12	11	12	11	4
24	(Japan) M Yoshida	11	11	11	10	8	7	13
3	(Brazil) G Tsuboi	7	7	6	12	11	11	11

Third round
(France) A Landrieu	13	11	7	11	2	6	12
12	(Poland) J Dyjas	11	9	11	5	11	11	14
(France) S Ouaiche	9	10	8	9
24	(Japan) M Yoshida	11	12	11	11

Quarterfinals
12	(Poland) J Dyjas	9	7	11	11	11	10	11
24	(Japan) M Yoshida	11	11	5	7	9	12	8

==== Bottom half ====
===== Section 3 =====
First round
4	(Greece) P Gionis	9	8	11	11	7	5
(Japan) T Jin	11	11	7	8	11	11
(Russia) A Tiutriumov	8	11	8	9	5
28	(Chinese Taipei) Peng W-w	11	9	11	11
30	(Scotland) G Rumgay	10	9	11	3
(France) E Angles	12	11	13	11
(Chinese Taipei) Hung T-h	4	11	7	5	7
9	(Germany) R Filus	11	9	11	11	11
10	(Brazil) E Jouti	11	11	11	11
(Thailand) P Tanviriyavechakul	6	5	9	5
(India) M V Thakkar	11	12	11	11	11
19	(Hungary) B Majoros	9	10	3	13	6
27	(Czech Republic) T Konecny	11	4	11	9	9	11	13
(Chinese Taipei) Yang H-w	9	11	9	11	11	4	12
(Russia) S Ismailov	13	4	12	2	11	5	11
5	(Egypt) O Assar	11	11	10	11	5	11	7

Second round
(Japan) T Jin	11	11	11	11
28	(Chinese Taipei) Peng W-w	5	3	6	7
(France) E Angles	6	11	11	7	11	9	7
9	(Germany) R Filus	11	7	7	11	9	11	11
10	(Brazil) E Jouti	11	11	5	11	9	11
(India) M V Thakkar	8	8	11	9	11	6
27	(Czech Republic) T Konecny	9	11	10	11	11	11	13
(Russia) S Ismailov	11	6	12	7	13	6	11

Third round
(Japan) T Jin	8	11	11	12	7	6	11
9	(Germany) R Filus	11	7	8	10	11	11	8
10	(Brazil) E Jouti	17	12	11	11
27	(Czech Republic) T Konecny	15	10	5	7

Quarterfinals
(Japan) T Jin	11	11	9	11	11
10	(Brazil) E Jouti	8	9	11	7	7

===== Section 4 =====
First round
6	(Slovakia) L Pistej	11	11	13	11	11
(Luxembourg) E Glod	13	5	11	8	9
(Chinese Taipei) Feng Y-h	11	10	9	10	6
22	(Hong Kong) Lam S H	7	12	11	12	11
18	(Croatia) F Kojic	11	7	13	7	13
(Russia) V Burov	8	11	15	11	15
(Russia) V Sidorenko	11	11	11	8	9	12
13	(Paraguay) M Aguirre	8	7	9	11	11	10
14	(Romania) H Szocs	11	1	11	7	11	7	11
(Poland) P Zatowka	6	11	1	11	9	11	9
(Chile) J Lamadrid	7	11	11	11	11
21	(Hungary) N Ecseki	11	8	8	8	7
20	(Austria) A Levenko	11	11	6	5	7	6
(Sweden) T Moregard	9	9	11	11	11	11
(Croatia) Wei SH	11	11	6	11	5	6	11
2	(Germany) R Walther	7	9	11	6	11	11	6

Second round
6	(Slovakia) L Pistej	11	11	12	9	11
22	(Hong Kong) Lam S H	5	7	10	11	9
(Russia) V Burov	11	8	11	4	11	9	8
(Russia) V Sidorenko	7	11	7	11	4	11	11
14	(Romania) H Szocs	3	9	11	7	11	11	11
(Chile) J Lamadrid	11	11	9	11	4	6	6
(Sweden) T Moregard	8	2	11	14	9
(Croatia) Wei SH	11	11	7	16	11

Third round
6	(Slovakia) L Pistej	11	11	10	11	11
(Russia) V Sidorenko	8	6	12	6	8
14	(Romania) H Szocs	7	6	8	9
(Croatia) Wei SH	11	11	11	11

Quarterfinals
6	(Slovakia) L Pistej	11	11	8	7	10	11	8
(Croatia) Wei SH	7	7	11	11	12	1	11

== Women's singles ==
=== Seeds ===
1. (Puerto Rico) Adriana Diaz (third round)
2. (Hungary) Georgina Pota (champion)
3. (Japan) Miyu Nagasaki (quarter-finals)
4. (Hong Kong) Soo Wai Yam (semi-finals)
5. (United States) Wu Yue (second round)
6. (Ukraine) Margaryta Pesotska (final)
7. (Hong Kong) Ng Wing Nam (second round)
8. (Russia) Yana Noskova (first round)
9. (Hungary) Szandra Pergel (first round)
10. (Brazil) Bruna Takahashi (quarter-finals)
11. (Austria) Amelie Solja (second round)
12. (Japan) Satsuki Odo (semi-finals)
13. (Hungary) Dora Madarasz (quarter-finals)
14. (Luxembourg) Sarah De Nutte (second round)
15. (United States) Lily Zhang (quarter-finals)
16. (Slovenia) Alex Galic (first round)
17. (Japan) Miyuu Kihara (second round)
18. (France) Stephanie Loeuillette (first round)
19. (Portugal) Jieni Shao (third round)
20. (Switzerland) Rachel Moret (first round)
21. (Russia) Mariia Tailakova (first round)
22. (Croatia) Mateja Jeger (first round)
23. (Italy) Debora Vivarelli (first round)
24. (Austria) Yui Hamamoto (third round)
25. (India) Ayhika Mukherjee (first round)
26. (India) Madhurika Patkar (first round)
27. (France) Pauline Chasselin (second round)
28. (Romania) Irina Ciobanu (second round)
29. (Chile) Paulina Vega (first round)
30. (Slovakia) Tatiana Kukulkova (first round)
31. (Japan) Yumeno Soma (third round)
32. (Slovenia) Aleksandra Vovk (first round)

=== Draw ===
==== Finals ====
Semifinals
6	(Ukraine) Margaryta Pesotska	11	11	11	11
12	(Japan) Satsuki Odo	8	7	8	5
4	(Hong Kong) Soo Wai Yam Minnie	8	6	11	11	11	8	6
2	(Hungary) Georgina Pota	11	11	9	6	5	11	11

Final
6	(Ukraine) Margaryta Pesotska	11	6	11	5	11	9	13
2	(Hungary) Georgina Pota	6	11	7	11	6	11	11

==== Top half ====
===== Section 1 =====
First round
1	(Puerto Rico) A Diaz	11	11	11	11
(Sweden) J Jonsson	5	3	8	4
(Croatia) D Srebrnjak
28	(Romania) I Ciobanu	w/o
32	(Slovenia) A Vovk	6	11	7	11	11	10	7
(Hungary) M Nagyvaradi	11	7	11	9	7	12	11
(Chinese Taipei) Huang Y-c	7	11	9	5	16
15	(United States) L Zhang	11	5	11	11	18
16	(Slovenia) A Galic	8	11	7	8	11	13	5
(Serbia) A Todorovic	11	6	11	11	7	11	11
(Croatia) I Jazbec	2	7	8	9
24	(Austria) Y Hamamoto	11	11	11	11
20	(Switzerland) R Moret	11	8	7	4	7
(Hong Kong) Li C W	7	11	11	11	11
(Hong Kong) Mak T W	3	11	4	11	3
6	(Ukraine) M Pesotska	11	13	11	2	11

Second round
1	(Puerto Rico) A Diaz	14	9	11	11	11
28	(Romania) I Ciobanu	12	11	7	9	7
(Hungary) M Nagyvaradi	8	11	5	7	8
15	(United States) L Zhang	11	6	11	11	11
(Serbia) A Todorovic	6	7	8	6
24	(Austria) Y Hamamoto	11	11	11	11
(Hong Kong) Li C W	9	5	10	3
6	(Ukraine) M Pesotska	11	11	12	11

Third round
1	(Puerto Rico) A Diaz	7	14	11	9	11	11
15	(United States) L Zhang	11	16	9	11	7	13
24	(Austria) Y Hamamoto	11	7	8	6	11	2
6	(Ukraine) M Pesotska	7	11	11	11	9	11

Quarterfinals
15	(United States) L Zhang	7	11	11	8	10	9
6	(Ukraine) M Pesotska	11	6	8	11	12	11

===== Section 2 =====
First round
5	(United States) Wu Y	9	11	13	11	11
(Hong Kong) Zhu C Z	11	9	11	8	8
(South Korea) Shin Y-b	12	11	11	13	11
22	(Croatia) M Jeger	14	8	7	11	7
25	(India) A Mukherjee	9	11	6	9
(Japan) H Nakamori	11	13	11	11
(Uzbekistan) O Kim	11	8	6	3	8
12	(Japan) S Odo	4	11	11	11	11
9	(Hungary) S Pergel	11	6	9	8	11	11	5
(Ukraine) S Brateyko	8	11	11	11	1	4	11
(Chinese Taipei) Su P-l	5	3	5	12
19	(Portugal) Shao JN	11	11	11	11
21	(Russia) M Tailakova	10	6	11	9
(Hungary) O Feher	12	11	13	11
(Slovenia) L Opeka	5	8	5	8
3	(Japan) M Nagasaki	11	11	11	11

Second round
5	(United States) Wu Y	7	9	5	13	9
(South Korea) Shin Y-b	11	11	11	11	11
(Japan) H Nakamori	7	8	2	11	11	10
12	(Japan) S Odo	11	11	11	3	8	12
(Ukraine) S Brateyko	4	4	6	8
19	(Portugal) Shao JN	11	11	11	11
(Hungary) O Feher	2	5	4	11
3	(Japan) M Nagasaki	11	11	11	13

Third round
(South Korea) Shin Y-b	7	12	7	10	9
12	(Japan) S Odo	11	10	11	12	11
19	(Portugal) Shao JN	3	5	7	11	11	11	9
3	(Japan) M Nagasaki	11	11	11	4	7	6	11

Quarterfinals
12	(Japan) S Odo	11	4	7	5	11	11	12
3	(Japan) M Nagasaki	6	11	11	11	9	5	10

==== Bottom half ====
===== Section 3 =====
First round
4	(Hong Kong) M Soo	11	11	7	11	11
(Belgium) M Degraef	7	4	11	6	9
(Serbia) D Vignjevic	9	5	5	3
17	(Japan) M Kihara	11	11	11	11
18	(France) S Loeuillette	12	11	11	5	5	9	7
(Russia) O Vorobeva	10	9	7	11	11	11	11
(Chinese Taipei) Huang Y-h	5	7	6	11
14	(Luxembourg) S De Nutte	11	11	11	13
13	(Hungary) D Madarasz	7	3	11	12	11	10	11
(France) A Zarif	11	11	5	10	9	12	6
(France) M Migot	11	11	11	11
30	(Slovakia) T Kukulkova	2	8	6	7
31	(Japan) Y Soma	9	11	11	11	11
(Thailand) O Paranang	11	7	9	9	8
(Brazil) C Kumahara	8	1	9	10
7	(Hong Kong) Ng W N	11	11	11	12

Second round
4	(Hong Kong) M Soo	16	11	6	11	11	11
17	(Japan) M Kihara	18	4	11	8	9	8
(Russia) O Vorobeva	4	9	16	11	11	11
14	(Luxembourg) S De Nutte	11	11	14	5	5	8
13	(Hungary) D Madarasz	11	11	9	11	11
(France) M Migot	6	7	11	9	6
31	(Japan) Y Soma	11	11	11	11
7	(Hong Kong) Ng W N	2	5	1	5

Third round
4	(Hong Kong) M Soo	9	11	11	8	8	11	11
(Russia) O Vorobeva	11	5	1	11	11	5	4
13	(Hungary) D Madarasz	10	11	11	11	11
31	(Japan) Y Soma	12	4	7	3	9

Quarterfinals
4	(Hong Kong) M Soo	11	11	11	11
13	(Hungary) D Madarasz	4	6	3	5

===== Section 4 =====
First round
8	(Russia) Y Noskova	11	9	3	11	8	11	4
(Poland) N Bajor	4	11	11	9	11	9	11
(India) S Mukherjee	9	9	11	8	11	7
27	(France) P Chasselin	11	11	8	11	9	11
29	(Chile) P Vega	7	11	3	9	8
(India) K Roy	11	9	11	11	11
(Thailand) N Komwong	11	6	11	8	4	12
10	(Brazil) B Takahashi	9	11	9	11	11	14
11	(Austria) A Solja	7	11	8	11	11	11
(Sweden) C Kallberg	11	6	11	5	7	7
(Russia) A Kolish	7	15	11	12	5	11
23	(Italy) D Vivarelli	11	13	7	10	11	5
26	(India) M Patkar	5	3	1	9
(Japan) H Ojio	11	11	11	11
(India) A G Kamath	6	6	6	11	8
2	(Hungary) G Pota	11	11	11	5	11

Second round
(Poland) N Bajor	11	11	5	11	14	11
27	(France) P Chasselin	9	13	11	6	12	7
(India) K Roy	5	11	6	12	7
10	(Brazil) B Takahashi	11	5	11	14	11
11	(Austria) A Solja	11	11	5	9	11	9	7
(Russia) A Kolish	9	8	11	11	2	11	11
(Japan) H Ojio	5	5	5	6
2	(Hungary) G Pota	11	11	11	11

Third round
(Poland) N Bajor	8	8	6	11	5
10	(Brazil) B Takahashi	11	11	11	8	11
(Russia) A Kolish	9	11	8	8	9
2	(Hungary) G Pota	11	8	11	11	11

Quarterfinals
10	(Brazil) B Takahashi	12	11	4	10	11	5	8
2	(Hungary) G Pota	10	6	11	12	5	11	11

== Men's doubles ==
=== Seeds ===
1. (Brazil) Gustavo Tsuboi / Eric Jouti (champion)
2. (Poland) Marek Badowski / Patryk Zatowka (quarter-finals)
3. (Hungary) Nandor Ecseki / Bence Majoros (quarter-finals)
4. (Hong Kong) Lam Siu Hang / (Japan) Takuya Jin (quarter-finals)
5. (Poland) Maciej Kubik / Jakub Dyjas (semi-finals)
6. (Paraguay) Marcelo Aguirre / (Spain) Carlos Caballero (first round)
7. (Puerto Rico) Daniel Gonzalez / Brian Afandor (first round)
8. (Slovenia) Peter Hribar / Tilen Cvetko (first round)

=== Draw ===
First round
1	(Brazil) E Jouti (Brazil) G Tsuboi	11	11	11
(Chinese Taipei) Feng Y-h (Chinese Taipei) Hung T-h	7	7	8
(Serbia) D Levajac (Serbia) Z Peto	11	11	12	8	11
7	(Puerto Rico) B Afanador (Puerto Rico) D Gonzalez	13	9	10	11	7
6	(Paraguay) M Aguirre (Spain) C Caballero	9	5	10
(Iran) A Ahmadian (Iran) M Lotfijanabadi	11	11	12
(Moldova) A Putuntica (Slovakia) A Valuch	11	5	7	11	4
4	(Japan) T Jin (Hong Kong) Lam S H	6	11	11	8	11
3	(Hungary) N Ecseki (Hungary) B Majoros	11	11	12
(Kazakhstan) A Kenzhigulov (Austria) D Serdaroglu	3	7	10
(France) L De Nodrest (France) J Rolland	7	11	8	6
5	(Poland) J Dyjas (Poland) M Kubik	11	6	11	11
8	(Slovenia) T Cvetko (Slovenia) P Hribar	1	8	2
(Chinese Taipei) Huang C-t (Chinese Taipei) Wang T-w	11	11	11
(Japan) H Tazoe (Japan) K Tazoe	7	11	4	8
2	(Poland) M Badowski (Poland) P Zatowka	11	9	11	11

Quarterfinals
1	(Brazil) E Jouti (Brazil) G Tsuboi	12	11	11
(Serbia) D Levajac (Serbia) Z Peto	10	1	6
(Iran) A Ahmadian (Iran) M Lotfijanabadi	8	3	11	11	11
4	(Japan) T Jin (Hong Kong) Lam S H	11	11	9	6	7
3	(Hungary) N Ecseki (Hungary) B Majoros	9	5	12	7
5	(Poland) J Dyjas (Poland) M Kubik	11	11	10	11
(Chinese Taipei) Huang C-t (Chinese Taipei) Wang T-w	11	11	11
2	(Poland) M Badowski (Poland) P Zatowka	7	9	7

Semifinals
1	(Brazil) E Jouti (Brazil) G Tsuboi	11	11	11
(Iran) A Ahmadian (Iran) M Lotfijanabadi	5	8	4
5	(Poland) J Dyjas (Poland) M Kubik	6	11	4	11	12
(Chinese Taipei) Huang C-t (Chinese Taipei) Wang T-w	11	8	11	6	14

Final
1	(Brazil) E Jouti (Brazil) G Tsuboi	7	11	11	11
(Chinese Taipei) Huang C-t (Chinese Taipei) Wang T-w	11	7	4	9

== Women's doubles ==
=== Seeds ===
1. (Hong Kong) Ng Wing Nam / Soo Wai Yam (quarter-finals)
2. (Japan) Satsuki Odo / Saki Shibata (final)
3. (United States) Wu Yue / Lily Zhang (first round)
4. (Hungary) Szandra Pergel / Dora Madarasz (semi-finals)
5. (Chinese Taipei) Li Yu-jhun / Huang Yu-wen (quarter-finals)
6. (Japan) Miyuu Kihara / Miyu Nagasaki (champion)
7. (Luxembourg) Sarah De Nutte / Danielle Konsbruck (first round)
8. (Slovenia) Katarina Strazar / Aleksandra Vovk (first round)

=== Draw ===
First round
1	(Hong Kong) Ng W N (Hong Kong) M Soo	8	11	11	11
(France) O Guisnel (France) M Migot	11	1	9	2
(Hungary) B Balint (Hungary) M Nagyvaradi	6	9	11	6
6	(Japan) M Kihara (Japan) M Nagasaki	11	11	6	11
5	(Chinese Taipei) Huang Y-w (Chinese Taipei) Li Y-j	7	11	11	15
(France) L Pfefer (France) A Zarif	11	3	9	13
(India) S Mukherjee (India) M Patkar	11	5	6	6
4	(Hungary) D Madarasz (Hungary) S Pergel	6	11	11	11
3	(United States) Y Wu (United States) L Zhang	7	9	5
(Hong Kong) Liu Q (Hong Kong) Mak T W	11	11	11
(Norway) Ma W (Poland) M Sikorska	11	9	9	11	13
7	(Luxembourg) S De Nutte (Luxembourg) D Konsbruck	6	11	11	4	11
8	(Slovenia) K Strazar (Slovenia) A Vovk	8	6	9
(Russia) V shcherbatykh (Russia) M Tailakova	11	11	11
(Hong Kong) Li C W (Hong Kong) Zhu C Z	4	10	9
2	(Japan) S Odo (Japan) S Shibata	11	12	11

Quarterfinals
1	(Hong Kong) Ng W N (Hong Kong) M Soo	7	10	8
6	(Japan) M Kihara (Japan) M Nagasaki	11	12	11
5	(Chinese Taipei) Huang Y-w (Chinese Taipei) Li Y-j	10	8	3
4	(Hungary) D Madarasz (Hungary) S Pergel	12	11	11
(Hong Kong) Liu Q (Hong Kong) Mak T W	8	7	11	9
(Norway) Ma W (Poland) M Sikorska	11	11	9	11
(Russia) V shcherbatykh (Russia) M Tailakova	9	3	3
2	(Japan) S Odo (Japan) S Shibata	11	11	11

Semifinals
6	(Japan) M Kihara (Japan) M Nagasaki	12	11	9	11
(Hungary) D Madarasz (Hungary) S Pergel	10	9	11	5
(Norway) Ma W (Poland) M Sikorska	7	7	11	6
2	(Japan) S Odo (Japan) S Shibata	11	11	5	11

Final
6	(Japan) M Kihara (Japan) M Nagasaki	11	11	11
2	(Japan) S Odo (Japan) S Shibata	6	5	7
