= 2019 Serbia Open (table tennis) =

Tournament details
- Dates: 3–5 May 2019
- Competitors: 64S / 16D
- Total prize money: US$30,000
- Location: Belgrade, Serbia

Champions
- Men's singles: (England) Paul Drinkhall
- Women's singles: (Japan) Hina Hayata
- Men's doubles: (Portugal) Diago Carvalho (Portugal) João Geraldo
- Women's doubles: (Hong Kong) Ng Wing Nam (Hong Kong) Soo Wai Yam Minnie

The 2019 Serbia Open is the fourth event of the 2019 ITTF Challenge Series. It takes place from 3–5 May in Belgrade, Serbia.

== Men's singles ==
=== Seeds ===
1. (Austria) Stefan Fegerl (third round)
2. (Croatia) Tomislav Pucar (third round)
3. (Paraguay) Marcelo Aguirre (third round)
4. (Belgium) Florent Lambiet (second round)
5. (England) Samuel Walker (first round)
6. (Japan) Masaki Yoshida (first round)
7. (Hong Kong) Lam Siu Hang (second round)
8. (Belgium) Robin Devos (second round)
9. (Brazil) Thiago Monteiro (first round)
10. (India) Harmeet Desai (third round)
11. (Belgium) Martin Allegro (second round)
12. (England) Paul Drinkhall (champion)
13. (Portugal) João Geraldo (second round)
14. (Hungary) Nandor Ecseki (first round)
15. (Portugal) Diogo Carvalho (third round)
16. (Croatia) Frane Kojić (quarterfinals)
17. (Hungary) Bence Majoros (first round)
18. (Brazil) Vitor Ishiy (first round)
19. (Puerto Rico) Brian Afanador (semifinals)
20. (Chile) Gustavo Gomez (first round)
21. (France) Andrea Landrieu (semifinals)
22. (Nigeria) Olajide Omotayo (second round)
23. (Hungary) Tamas Lakatos (first round)
24. (Scotland) Gavin Rumgay (first round)
25. (Chile) Juan Lamadrid (second round)
26. (Hungary) Adam Szudi (third round)
27. (Puerto Rico) Daniel González (first round)
28. (Japan) Yuki Matsuyama (third round)
29. (Sweden) Elias Ranefur (second round)
30. (France) Enzo Angles (second round)
31. (Serbia) Zsolt Peto (second round)
32. (Serbia) Marko Jevtović (first round)

=== Draw ===
==== Top half ====
===== Section 1 =====
First round
1	(Austria) Stefan Fegerl	11	11	11	11
(Kazakhstan) Denis Zholudev	3	3	8	7
(Canada) Jeremy Hazin	4	11	6	8	12
31	(Serbia) Zsolt Peto	11	7	11	11	14
25	(Chile) Juan Lamadrid	12	11	6	7	11	11	13
(Japan) Kakeru Sone	10	6	11	11	13	7	11
(France) Leo De Nodrest	2	8	8	11	9
12	(England) Paul Drinkhall	11	11	11	5	11
10	(India) Harmeet Desai	10	11	11	11	11
(Sweden) Simon Arvidsson	12	8	8	8	5
(Denmark) Tobias Rasmussen	11	8	8	8	10
29	(Sweden) Elias Ranefur	7	11	11	11	12
23	(Hungary) Tamas Lakatos	11	11	6	8	5	10
(Russia) Sadi Ismailov	9	8	11	11	11	12
(Japan) Shogo Tahara	11	11	11	12
5	(England) Samuel Walker	4	7	9	10

Second round
1	(Austria) Stefan Fegerl	9	7	11	8	11	11	11
31	(Serbia) Zsolt Peto	11	11	5	11	8	7	5
25	(Chile) Juan Lamadrid	1	5	11	3	11	8
12	(England) Paul Drinkhall	11	11	5	11	7	11
10	(India) Harmeet Desai	13	11	13	12
29	(Sweden) Elias Ranefur	11	5	11	10
(Russia) Sadi Ismailov	11	11	11	11	9	3	9
(Japan) Shogo Tahara	3	13	6	8	11	11	11

Third round
1	(Austria) Stefan Fegerl	7	11	11	9	11	5	6
12	(England) Paul Drinkhall	11	5	9	11	2	11	11
10	(India) Harmeet Desai	4	8	11	11	11	9	9
(Japan) Shogo Tahara	11	11	5	7	5	11	11

Quarterfinals
12	(England) Paul Drinkhall	11	11	7	11	11
(Japan) Shogo Tahara	2	9	11	9	7

===== Section 2 =====
First round
8	(Belgium) Robin Devos	11	11	11	9	11
(Serbia) Dimitrije Levajac	7	9	2	11	7
(Luxembourg) Eric Glod	8	7	13	6	7
28	(Japan) Yuki Matsuyama	11	11	11	11	11
21	(France) Andrea Landrieu	w/o
(Germany) Kilian Ort
(France) Jules Rolland	11	10	11	11	11
14	(Hungary) Nandor Ecseki	6	12	8	9	6
16	(Croatia) Frane Kojić	11	5	11	11	11	11
(Russia) Vildan Gadiev	13	11	9	6	4	7
(Germany) Dennis Klein	11	8	6	11	5	11	11
18	(Brazil) Vitor Ishiy	8	11	11	4	11	8	9
22	(Nigeria) Olajide Omotayo	9	11	11	11	6	11
(Russia) Petr Fesotov	11	8	9	5	11	4
(Germany) Nils Hohmeier	12	7	11	8	12	6	10
3	(Paraguay) Marcelo Aguirre	10	11	6	11	10	11	12

Second round
8	(Belgium) Robin Devos	8	9	5	6
28	(Japan) Yuki Matsuyama	11	11	11	11
21	(France) Andrea Landrieu	11	8	9	11	11	11
(France) Jules Rolland	8	11	11	7	3	2
16	(Croatia) Frane Kojić	9	11	11	12	10	11
(Germany) Dennis Klein	11	6	3	10	12	2
22	(Nigeria) Olajide Omotayo	11	11	4	8	8	7
3	(Paraguay) Marcelo Aguirre	9	9	11	11	11	11

Third round
28	(Japan) Yuki Matsuyama	11	7	6	7	13	13	7
21	(France) Andrea Landrieu	9	11	11	11	11	11	11
16	(Croatia) Frane Kojić	9	5	11	11	11	15
3	(Paraguay) Marcelo Aguirre	11	11	9	8	6	13

Quarterfinals
21	(France) Andrea Landrieu	11	11	8	11	11
16	(Croatia) Frane Kojić	5	7	11	9	7

==== Bottom half ====
===== Section 3 =====
First round
4	(Belgium) Florent Lambiet	11	9	8	11	11	5	12
(Slovenia) Peter Hribar	9	11	11	8	4	11	10
(Japan) Masaki Takami	11	9	11	9	7	4
26	(Hungary) Adam Szudi	9	11	8	11	11	11
19	(Puerto Rico) Brian Afanador	8	13	11	9	4	11	11
(Sweden) Fabian Akerstrom	11	11	6	11	11	8	7
(Japan) Asuka Machi	7	11	9	11	2	11	11
13	(Portugal) João Geraldo	11	2	11	6	11	4	13
9	(Brazil) Thiago Monteiro	11	4	11	11	7	7
(Russia) Viacheslav Burov	9	11	13	5	11	11
(Germany) Tobias Hippler	11	11	11	12	9	9	9
30	(France) Enzo Angles	7	6	5	14	11	11	11
32	(Serbia) Marko Jevtović	7	11	8	11	11	7	10
(Japan) Yuta Tanaka	11	9	11	4	8	11	12
(Austria) David Serdaroglu	4	9	11	5	4
7	(Hong Kong) Lam Siu Hang	11	11	8	11	11

Second round
4	(Belgium) Florent Lambiet	10	6	11	4
26	(Hungary) Adam Szudi	12	11	13	11
19	(Puerto Rico) Brian Afanador	11	5	11	14	7	9	11
13	(Portugal) João Geraldo	6	11	7	12	11	11	2
(Russia) Viacheslav Burov	11	12	6	11	11
30	(France) Enzo Angles	8	10	11	9	5
(Japan) Yuta Tanaka	11	11	11	11	11
7	(Hong Kong) Lam Siu Hang	4	6	5	13	8

Third round
26	(Hungary) Adam Szudi	3	11	5	12	11	12	8
19	(Puerto Rico) Brian Afanador	11	7	11	10	6	14	11
(Russia) Viacheslav Burov	8	11	6	11	6	8
(Japan) Yuta Tanaka	11	7	11	7	11	11

Quarterfinals
19	(Puerto Rico) Brian Afanador	11	8	11	11	11
(Japan) Yuta Tanaka	8	11	8	4	8

===== Section 4 =====
First round
6	(Japan) Masaki Yoshida	9	5	11	11	6
(France) Abdel-Kader Salifou	11	11	13	6	11
(Slovakia) Samuel Novota	16	11	11	14
20	(Chile) Gustavo Gomez	14	7	8	12
27	(Puerto Rico) Daniel González	8	4	2	11	11	6
(Belgium) Florian Cnudde	11	11	11	7	8	11
(Hong Kong) Kwan Man Ho	3	8	7	13	14	8
15	(Portugal) Diogo Carvalho	11	11	11	11	12	11
11	(Belgium) Martin Allegro	8	13	7	14	11	11
(Romania) Alexandru Cazacu	11	11	11	12	8	7
(Russia) Lev Katsman	11	10	11	11	11
17	(Hungary) Bence Majoros	4	12	6	8	5
24	(Scotland) Gavin Rumgay	6	6	11	11	6
(Iran) Amin Ahmadian	11	11	3	13	11
(Russia) Nikita Artemenko	13	9	9	5
2	(Croatia) Tomislav Pucar	15	11	11	11

Second round
(France) Abdel-Kader Salifou	13	11	11	11
(Slovakia) Samuel Novota	11	5	4	6
(Belgium) Florian Cnudde	7	7	11	7	8
15	(Portugal) Diogo Carvalho	11	11	4	11	11
11	(Belgium) Martin Allegro	9	1	4	11	6
(Russia) Lev Katsman	11	11	11	8	11
(Iran) Amin Ahmadian	7	10	12	6
2	(Croatia) Tomislav Pucar	11	12	14	11

Third round
(France) Abdel-Kader Salifou	11	6	8	11	11	14
15	(Portugal) Diogo Carvalho	9	11	11	8	7	12
(Russia) Lev Katsman	11	10	11	11	11
2	(Croatia) Tomislav Pucar	9	12	9	7	9

Quarterfinals
(France) Abdel-Kader Salifou	11	11	11	11
(Russia) Lev Katsman	6	6	8	5

==== Finals ====
Semifinals									Final
12	(England) Paul Drinkhall	11	11	8	6	9	11	11
21	(France) Andrea Landrieu	2	3	11	11	11	4	5	12	(England) Paul Drinkhall	8	10	12	11	11	11
19	(Puerto Rico) Brian Afanador	13	11	9	10	8	7			(France) Abdel-Kader Salifou	11	12	10	3	2	1
	(France) Abdel-Kader Salifou	11	9	11	12	11	11

== Women's singles ==
=== Seeds ===
1. (Japan) Hina Hayata (champion)
2. (Hong Kong) Soo Wai Yam Minnie (final)
3. (Hong Kong) Ng Wing Nam (quarterfinals)
4. (Slovakia) Barbora Balážová (semifinals)
5. (Russia) Polina Mikhailova (semifinals)
6. (Russia) Yana Noskova (second round)
7. (Hungary) Szandra Pergel (quarterfinals)
8. (Spain) Galia Dvorak (first round)
9. (Hungary) Dóra Madarász (third round)
10. (France) Stéphanie Loeuillette (third round)
11. (Italy) Debora Vivarelli (first round)
12. (Spain) Zhang Sofia-Xuan (second round)
13. (Serbia) Izabela Lupulesku (second round)
14. (Portugal) Shao Jieni (second round)
15. (Japan) Sakura Mori (third round)
16. (France) Pauline Chasselin (second round)
17. (Italy) Li Xiang (quarterfinals)
18. (Serbia) Andrea Todorović (second round)
19. (Italy) Chiara Colantoni (first round)
20. (France) Audrey Zarif (third round)
21. (Hong Kong) Li Ching Wan (first round)
22. (Hong Kong) Mak Tze Wing (second round)
23. (Argentina) Camila Arguelles (first round)
24. (Argentina) Ana Codina (first round)
25. (Hungary) Bernadett Balint (first round)
26. (Russia) Yulia Prokhorova (first round)
27. (Bulgaria) Maria Yovkova (first round)
28. (Hong Kong) Zhu Chengzhu (third round)
29. (Canada) Alicia Cote (first round)
30. (Chile) Judith Morales (first round)
31. (Serbia) Dragana Vignjević (second round)
32. (France) Laura Pfefer (first round)

=== Draw ===
==== Top half ====
===== Section 1 =====
First round
1	(Japan) Hina Hayata	11	11	11	11
(Kazakhstan) Gulchekhra Khusseinova	1	4	2	7
(Brazil) Caroline Kumahara	12	11	13	11	6	7	12
23	(Argentina) Camila Arguelles	14	8	11	2	11	11	10
27	(Bulgaria) Maria Yovkova	7	8	6	10
(Japan) Airi Abe	11	11	11	12
(Kazakhstan) Anastassiya Lavrova	4	9	5	11	8
16	(France) Pauline Chasselin	11	11	11	8	11
14	(Portugal) Shao Jieni	11	9	6	11	11	14
(Hungary) Mercedes Nagyvaradi	7	11	11	7	7	12
(India) Krittwika Roy	11	8	11	11	8	11
21	(Hong Kong) Li Ching Wan	7	11	8	6	11	8
19	(Italy) Chiara Colantoni	6	14	7	11	11	11	9
(France) Oceane Guisnel	11	12	11	13	5	8	11
(Slovakia) Natalia Grigelova	5	8	8	11
7	(Hungary) Szandra Pergel	11	11	11	13

Second round
1	(Japan) Hina Hayata	11	11	11	11
(Brazil) Caroline Kumahara	7	5	2	1
(Japan) Airi Abe	16	11	9	11	12
16	(France) Pauline Chasselin	14	7	11	9	10
14	(Portugal) Shao Jieni	8	12	5	8	8
(India) Krittwika Roy	11	10	11	11	11
(France) Oceane Guisnel	8	7	15	10
7	(Hungary) Szandra Pergel	11	11	17	12

Third round
1	(Japan) Hina Hayata	11	7	12	11	11
(Japan) Airi Abe	9	11	10	5	6
(India) Krittwika Roy	7	1	9	11	11	11	5
7	(Hungary) Szandra Pergel	11	11	11	9	7	9	11

Quarterfinals
1	(Japan) Hina Hayata	6	11	11	11	11
7	(Hungary) Szandra Pergel	11	1	6	1	3

===== Section 2 =====
First round
5	(Russia) Polina Mikhailova	11	11	11	11
(Croatia) Hana Arapović	8	8	7	6
(Hungary) Orsolya Feher	11	11	11	11	11
24	(Argentina) Ana Codina	9	4	8	13	9
28	(Hong Kong) Zhu Chengzhu	11	11	11	11
(Russia) Kristina Kazantseva	7	7	6	6
(Kazakhstan) Zauresh Akasheva	10	10	10	6
12	(Spain) Zhang Sofia-Xuan	12	12	12	11
10	(France) Stéphanie Loeuillette	11	11	11	11
(Croatia) Andrea Pavlović	9	7	4	9
(France) Leili Mostafavi	6	9	5	11	12	9
31	(Serbia) Dragana Vignjević	11	11	11	7	10	11
25	(Hungary) Bernadett Balint	4	11	11	8	11	11	4
(Croatia) Ivana Malobabić	11	4	8	11	13	3	11
(Italy) Le Thi Hong Loan	7	3	7	9
3	(Hong Kong) Ng Wing Nam	11	11	11	11

Second round
5	(Russia) Polina Mikhailova	11	11	11	14
(Hungary) Orsolya Feher	3	2	4	12
28	(Hong Kong) Zhu Chengzhu	11	11	11	11
12	(Spain) Zhang Sofia-Xuan	7	4	2	9
10	(France) Stéphanie Loeuillette	11	10	11	7	11	11
31	(Serbia) Dragana Vignjević	5	12	2	11	6	6
(Croatia) Ivana Malobabić	2	2	6	6
3	(Hong Kong) Ng Wing Nam	11	11	11	11

Third round
5	(Russia) Polina Mikhailova	11	11	11	11
28	(Hong Kong) Zhu Chengzhu	7	9	8	6
10	(France) Stéphanie Loeuillette	13	9	12	11	6	6
3	(Hong Kong) Ng Wing Nam	15	11	10	5	11	11

Quarterfinals
5	(Russia) Polina Mikhailova	11	7	11	11	9	8	11
3	(Hong Kong) Ng Wing Nam	7	11	9	7	11	11	5

==== Bottom half ====
===== Section 3 =====
First round
4	(Slovakia) Barbora Balážová	6	11	11	13	11
(Spain) Ana Garcia	11	7	9	11	5
(Serbia) Tijana Jokić	12	6	11	11	4	7
22	(Hong Kong) Mak Tze Wing	10	11	13	9	11	11
29	(Canada) Alicia Cote	3	3	6	4
(Hong Kong) Zhang Wenjing	11	11	11	11
(Slovakia) Eva Jurkova	4	13	4	7	11	11	11
11	(Italy) Debora Vivarelli	11	11	11	11	5	7	2
9	(Hungary) Dóra Madarász	11	11	11	11
(Croatia) Ida Jazbec	4	4	4	8
(Italy) Jamila Laurenti	12	11	7	8	11	8	9
18	(Serbia) Andrea Todorović	10	6	11	11	7	11	11
32	(France) Laura Pfefer	9	8	11	9	11	5
(Russia) Anna Bikbaeva	11	11	9	11	8	11
(Slovakia) Nikoleta Puchovanova	5	6	4	7
6	(Russia) Yana Noskova	11	11	11	11

Second round
4	(Slovakia) Barbora Balážová	11	11	14	11
22	(Hong Kong) Mak Tze Wing	8	8	12	9
(Hong Kong) Zhang Wenjing	11	11	11	11
(Slovakia) Eva Jurkova	7	5	6	7
9	(Hungary) Dóra Madarász	11	11	9	5	11	11
18	(Serbia) Andrea Todorović	8	5	11	11	9	6
(Russia) Anna Bikbaeva	11	11	8	7	11	11
6	(Russia) Yana Noskova	5	6	11	11	4	8

Third round
4	(Slovakia) Barbora Balážová	13	11	11	11
(Hong Kong) Zhang Wenjing	11	8	5	6
9	(Hungary) Dóra Madarász	5	7	9	5
(Russia) Anna Bikbaeva	11	11	11	11

Quarterfinals
4	(Slovakia) Barbora Balážová	11	11	11	11
(Russia) Anna Bikbaeva	8	9	8	5

===== Section 4 =====
First round
8	(Spain) Galia Dvorak	10	11	4	11	11	5	7
(Serbia) Sabina Šurjan	12	3	11	5	4	11	11
(Serbia) Aneta Maksuti	11	12	5	12	6	9
17	(Italy) Li Xiang	2	10	11	14	11	11
20	(France) Audrey Zarif	11	2	11	11	1	12	11
(Serbia) Monika Knežević	8	11	7	8	11	14	9
(Croatia) Petra Petek	11	7	7	8	8
13	(Serbia) Izabela Lupulesku	9	11	11	11	11
15	(Japan) Sakura Mori	DSQ
(Russia) Daria Shadrina
(Russia) Maria Malanina	11	11	11	13
30	(Chile) Judith Morales	2	6	5	11
26	(Russia) Yulia Prokhorova	6	10	11	7	11	9
(Hong Kong) Lam Yee Lok	11	12	7	11	8	11
(Kazakhstan) Alsu Saparova	4	6	5	7
2	(Hong Kong) Soo Wai Yam Minnie	11	11	11	11

Second round
(Serbia) Sabina Šurjan	5	5	13	11	11	3
17	(Italy) Li Xiang	11	11	11	13	9	11
20	(France) Audrey Zarif	11	12	11	12
13	(Serbia) Izabela Lupulesku	3	10	7	10
15	(Japan) Sakura Mori	6	9	11	8	11	11	11
(Russia) Maria Malanina	11	11	7	11	4	3	4
(Hong Kong) Lam Yee Lok	11	11	6	6	11	8
2	(Hong Kong) Soo Wai Yam Minnie	9	9	11	11	13	11

Third round
17	(Italy) Li Xiang	11	11	11	11
20	(France) Audrey Zarif	4	5	7	8
15	(Japan) Sakura Mori	11	11	9	10	7
2	(Hong Kong) Soo Wai Yam Minnie	7	13	11	12	11

Quarterfinals
17	(Italy) Li Xiang	7	5	11	8	11	6
2	(Hong Kong) Soo Wai Yam Minnie	11	11	9	11	5	11

==== Finals ====
Semifinals						Final
1	(Japan) Hina Hayata	11	11	11	11
5	(Russia) Polina Mikhailova	5	4	7	8	1	(Japan) Hina Hayata	11	11	10	11	11
4	(Slovakia) Barbora Balážová	8	8	8	8	2	(Hong Kong) Soo Wai Yam Minnie	9	7	12	9	9
2	(Hong Kong) Soo Wai Yam Minnie	11	11	11	11

== Men's doubles ==
=== Seeds ===
1. (Hungary) Nandor Ecseki / Adam Szudi (semifinals)
2. (Belgium) Martin Allegro / Florent Lambiet (quarterfinals)
3. (Italy) Chen Shuainan / (Hong Kong) Lam Siu Hang (quarterfinals)
4. (England) Paul Drinkhall / Samuel Walker (first round)
5. (Paraguay) Marcelo Aguirre / (Brazil) Thiago Monteiro (first round)
6. (Puerto Rico) Brian Afanador / Daniel González (quarterfinals)
7. (Saudi Arabia) Ali Alkhadrawi / Abdulaziz Bu Shulaybi (first round)
8. (Serbia) Marko Jevtović / Zsolt Peto (final)

=== Draw ===
First round
1	(Hungary) Nandor Ecseki (Hungary) Adam Szudi	11	11	13
(Chile) Gustavo Gomez (Chile) Juan Lamadrid	4	8	11
(Russia) Viacheslav Burov (Russia) Sadi Ismailov	11	6	11	7	11
5	(Paraguay) Marcelo Aguirre (Brazil) Thiago Monteiro	3	11	8	11	8
7	(Saudi Arabia) Ali Alkhadrawi (Saudi Arabia) Abdulaziz Bu Shulaybi	7	8	2
(Portugal) Diago Carvalho (Portugal) João Geraldo	11	11	11
(Luxembourg) Eric Glod (Hungary) Tamas Lakatos	4	11	8	11
3	(Italy) Chen Shuainan (Hong Kong) Lam Siu Hang	11	7	11	13
4	(England) Paul Drinkhall (England) Samuel Walker	6	7	8
(Hungary) Bence Majoros (Denmark) Tobias Rasmussen	11	11	11
(Sweden) Simon Arvidsson (Sweden) Elias Ranefur	4	6	7
6	(Puerto Rico) Brian Afanador (Puerto Rico) Daniel González	11	11	11
8	(Serbia) Marko Jevtović (Serbia) Zsolt Peto	9	11	4	12	11
(France) Leo de Nodrest (France) Jules Rolland	11	8	11	10	9
(Argentina) Gaston Alto (Chile) Nicolas Burgos	9	13	4	9
2	(Belgium) Martin Allegro (Belgium) Florent Lambiet	11	11	11	11

Quarterfinals
1	(Hungary) Nandor Ecseki (Hungary) Adam Szudi	11	11	7	11
(Russia) Viacheslav Burov (Russia) Sadi Ismailov	8	5	11	3
(Portugal) Diago Carvalho (Portugal) João Geraldo	11	13	10	11
3	(Italy) Chen Shuainan (Hong Kong) Lam Siu Hang	8	11	12	6
(Hungary) Bence Majoros (Denmark) Tobias Rasmussen	w/o
6	(Puerto Rico) Brian Afanador (Puerto Rico) Daniel González
8	(Serbia) Marko Jevtović (Serbia) Zsolt Peto	6	11	12	11
2	(Belgium) Martin Allegro (Belgium) Florent Lambiet	11	5	10	9

Semifinals
1	(Hungary) Nandor Ecseki (Hungary) Adam Szudi	10	11	6	14
(Portugal) Diago Carvalho (Portugal) João Geraldo	12	6	11	16
(Hungary) Bence Majoros (Denmark) Tobias Rasmussen	7	11	7	11	6
8	(Serbia) Marko Jevtović (Serbia) Zsolt Peto	11	9	11	7	11

Final
(Portugal) Diago Carvalho (Portugal) João Geraldo	11	11	13
8	(Serbia) Marko Jevtović (Serbia) Zsolt Peto	5	3	11

== Women's doubles ==
=== Seeds ===
1. (Hong Kong) Ng Wing Nam / Soo Wai Yam Minnie (champions)
2. (Hungary) Dóra Madarász / Szandra Pergel (final)
3. (France) Pauline Chasselin / Stéphanie Loeuillette (quarterfinals)
4. (Spain) Galia Dvorak / Zhang Sofia-Xuan (semifinals)
5. (Hungary) Bernadett Balint / Mercedes Nagyvaradi (first round)
6. (Argentina) Camila Arguelles / Ana Codina (quarterfinals)
7. (France) Laura Pfefer / Audrey Zarif (quarterfinals)
8. (Serbia) Izabela Lupulesku / Sabina Šurjan (semifinals)

=== Draw ===
First round
1	(Hong Kong) Ng Wing Nam (Hong Kong) Soo Wai Yam Minnie	7	17	11	7	11
(Italy) Li Xiang (Russia) Polina Mikhailova	11	15	6	11	4
(Hong Kong) Li Ching Wan (Hong Kong) Zhu Chengzhu	2	11	11	11
5	(Hungary) Bernadett Balint (Hungary) Mercedes Nagyvaradi	11	1	8	6
6	(Argentina) Camila Arguelles (Argentina) Ana Codina	11	11	4	8	11
(India) Krittwika Roy (India) Pooja Sahasrabudhe	9	6	11	11	7
(Russia) Daria Chernova (Russia) Maria Malanina	11	10	6	11	9
4	(Spain) Galia Dvorak (Spain) Zhang Sofia-Xuan	5	12	11	7	11
3	(France) Pauline Chasselin (France) Stéphanie Loeuillette	w/o
(Romania) Arina Singeorzan (Bulgaria) Maria Yovkova
(Italy) Chiara Colantoni (Italy) Le Thi Hong Loan	6	7	5
8	(Serbia) Izabela Lupulesku (Serbia) Sabina Šurjan	11	11	11
7	(France) Laura Pfefer (France) Audrey Zarif	7	6	11	11	11
(Italy) Jamila Laurenti (Italy) Debora Vivarelli	11	11	6	8	8
(Croatia) Ivana Malobabić (Croatia) Petra Petek	6	11	2	13
2	(Hungary) Dóra Madarász (Hungary) Szandra Pergel	11	9	11	15

Quarterfinals
1	(Hong Kong) Ng Wing Nam (Hong Kong) Soo Wai Yam Minnie	11	5	17	11
(Hong Kong) Li Ching Wan (Hong Kong) Zhu Chengzhu	7	11	15	9
6	(Argentina) Camila Arguelles (Argentina) Ana Codina	8	11	14	2	9
4	(Spain) Galia Dvorak (Spain) Zhang Sofia-Xuan	11	8	12	11	11
3	(France) Pauline Chasselin (France) Stéphanie Loeuillette	13	11	6	7
8	(Serbia) Izabela Lupulesku (Serbia) Sabina Šurjan	15	9	11	11
7	(France) Laura Pfefer (France) Audrey Zarif	5	8	5
2	(Hungary) Dóra Madarász (Hungary) Szandra Pergel	11	11	11

Semifinals
1	(Hong Kong) Ng Wing Nam (Hong Kong) Soo Wai Yam Minnie	11	11	11
4	(Spain) Galia Dvorak (Spain) Zhang Sofia-Xuan	6	3	7
8	(Serbia) Izabela Lupulesku (Serbia) Sabina Šurjan	7	3	15	12
2	(Hungary) Dóra Madarász (Hungary) Szandra Pergel	11	11	13	14

Final
1	(Hong Kong) Ng Wing Nam (Hong Kong) Soo Wai Yam Minnie	12	12	9	9	11
2	(Hungary) Dóra Madarász (Hungary) Szandra Pergel	10	10	11	11	7
