= 2019 ITTF Challenge Series =

Details
- Duration: 13 February – 8 December
- Edition: 3rd
- Tournaments: 17
- Categories: Challenge Plus (6); Challenge (10)

Achievements (singles)

The 2019 ITTF Challenge Series was the third season of the International Table Tennis Federation's secondary professional table tennis tour, a level below the ITTF World Tour. From this season, the ITTF Challenge Series will be split into two tiers: Challenge Plus and Challenge.

== Schedule ==
The tournaments in the 2019 tour have been split into two tiers: Challenge Plus and Challenge.

Below is the 2019 schedule announced by the International Table Tennis Federation:

Key

Challenge Plus
Challenge

No.	Date	Tournament	Location	Venue	Prize (USD)	Report	Ref.
1	13–17 February	Portugal Open	Lisbon	Pavilhão Desportivo do Casal Vistoso	60,000	Report	
2	20–24 March	Oman Open	Muscat	Sultan Qaboos Sports Complex	65,000	Report	
3	20–24 March	(Spain) Spanish Open	Guadalajara	Palacio Multiusos de Guadalajara	30,000	Report	
4	1–5 May	Serbia Open	Belgrade	BG Sport Centre Kovilovo	30,000	Report	
5	8–12 May	Slovenia Open	Otočec	Športni Center Otočec	30,000	Report	
6	14–18 May	Croatia Open	Zagreb	Hall of Sports Zagreb	30,000	Report	
7	22–26 May	Thailand Open	Bangkok	Island Hall, Fashion Island	30,000	Report	
8	24–28 July	(North Korea) Pyongyang Open	Pyongyang	Pyongyang Table Tennis Hall	60,000	Report	
9	7–11 August	Nigeria Open	Lagos	Sir Molade Okoya-Thomas Indoor Sports Hall	60,000	Report	
10	10–14 September	Paraguay Open	Asunción	SND Arena	60,000	Report	
11	16–20 October	(Poland) Polish Open	Władysławowo	Olympic Sport Center	30,000	Report	
12	30 October–3 November	Belarus Open	Minsk	Palace of Tennis	30,000	Report	
13	13–17 November	Indonesia Open	Batam	Hi-Test Arena	30,000	Report	
14	4–8 December	(Canada) North American Open	Markham	Markham Pan Am Centre	75,000	Report	

== Winners ==
Key

Challenge Plus
Challenge

Event	Men's singles	Women's singles	Men's doubles	Women's doubles	Mixed doubles	U21 Men's singles	U21 Women's singles
Portugal Open	(China) Liang Jingkun	(Japan) Hina Hayata	(China) Cao Wei (China) Xu Yingbin	(China) Fan Siqi (China) Yang Huijing	(China) Lin Gaoyuan (China) Liu Shiwen	(Japan) Shunsuke Togami	(China) Fan Siqi
Oman Open	(Chinese Taipei) Lin Yun-ju	(Japan) Hina Hayata	(Chinese Taipei) Liao Cheng-ting (Chinese Taipei) Lin Yun-ju	(Japan) Satsuki Odo (Japan) Saki Shibata	(Chinese Taipei) Lin Yun-ju (Chinese Taipei) Cheng I-ching	(Russia) Vladimir Sidorenko	(Japan) Satsuki Odo
(Spain) Spanish Open	(Denmark) Zhai Yujia	(Japan) Miyu Kato	(Germany) Kilian Ort (Germany) Qiu Dang	(France) Stéphanie Loeuillette (France) Yuan Jianan	Not held	(Argentina) Horacio Cifuentes	(Puerto Rico) Adriana Díaz
Serbia Open	(England) Paul Drinkhall	(Japan) Hina Hayata	(Portugal) Diago Carvalho (Portugal) João Geraldo	(Hong Kong) Ng Wing Nam (Hong Kong) Soo Wai Yam Minnie	Not held	(France) Leo De Nodrest	(Russia) Maria Malanina
Slovenia Open	(Croatia) Wei Shihao	(Hungary) Georgina Póta	(Brazil) Eric Jouti (Brazil) Gustavo Tsuboi	(Japan) Miyuu Kihara (Japan) Miyu Nagasaki	Not held	(Chinese Taipei) Feng Yi-hsin	(Japan) Miyu Nagasaki
Croatia Open	(Sweden) Anton Kallberg	(Japan) Miyuu Kihara	(Japan) Shunsuke Togami (Japan) Yukiya Uda	(Japan) Miyuu Kihara (Japan) Miyu Nagasaki	Not held	(Japan) Yukiya Uda	(Croatia) Sun Jiayi
Thailand Open	(Germany) Ruwen Filus	(Japan) Hitomi Sato	(Germany) Ruwen Filus (Germany) Steffen Mengel	(Japan) Satsuki Odo (Japan) Saki Shibata	Not held	(Chinese Taipei) Li Hsin-yu	(Japan) Yuka Umemura
(North Korea) Pyongyang Open	(North Korea) An Ji-song	(North Korea) Kim Song-i	(North Korea) Ham Yu-song (North Korea) Ri Kwang-myong	(North Korea) Cha Hyo-sim (North Korea) Kim Nam-hae	(North Korea) Ham Yu-song (North Korea) Cha Hyo-sim	(Chinese Taipei) Feng Yi-hsin	(North Korea) Pyon Song-gyong
(Nigeria) Nigerian Open	(Nigeria) Quadri Aruna	(Russia) Polina Mikhaylova	(Belgium) Cédric Nuytinck (France) Quentin Robinot	(Russia) Polina Mikhaylova (Russia) Yana Noskova	(Germany) Kilian Ort (Germany) Wan Yuan	(Romania) Cristian Pletea	(Romania) Andreea Dragoman
Paraguay Open	(Japan) Masataka Morizono	(Japan) Hina Hayata	(Japan) Masataka Morizono (Slovakia) Ľubomír Pištej	(Japan) Honoka Hashimoto (Japan) Maki Shiomi	(Puerto Rico) Brian Afanador (Puerto Rico) Adriana Díaz	(Argentina) Horacio Cifuentes	(Japan) Maki Shiomi
(Poland) Polish Open	(China) Xu Yingbin	(China) He Zhuojia	(Argentina) Gastón Alto (Argentina) Horacio Cifuentes	(Japan) Honoka Hashimoto (Japan) Maki Shiomi	Not held	(China) Xiang Peng	(China) Kuai Man
Belarus Open	(France) Emmanuel Lebesson	(Japan) Hina Hayata	(China) Xu Haidong (China) Zhao Zhaoyan	(Japan) Satsuki Odo (Japan) Saki Shibata	Not held	(China) Sai Linwei	(China) Shi Xunyao
Indonesia Open	(India) Harmeet Desai	(Portugal) Shao Jieni	(Senegal) Ibrahima Diaw (Thailand) Padasak Tanviriyavechakul	(Portugal) Luo Xue (Portugal) Shao Jieni	Not held	(Japan) Yuma Tanigaki	(Japan) Moe Nomura
(Canada) North American Open	(China) Xiang Peng	(Japan) Kasumi Ishikawa	(China) Cao Wei (China) Xu Yingbin	(Japan) Honoka Hashimoto (Japan) Hitomi Sato	(Slovakia) Ľubomír Pištej (Slovakia) Barbora Balážová	(India) Manav Thakkar	(China) Wang Xiaotong

== See also ==
- 2019 World Table Tennis Championships
- 2019 ITTF World Tour
