= 2019 Oman Open =

Tournament details
- Dates: 22–24 March 2019
- Competitors: 64MS / 32WS / 16D
- Total prize money: US$65,000
- Location: Muscat, Oman

Champions
- Men's singles: (Chinese Taipei) Lin Yun-ju
- Women's singles: (Japan) Hina Hayata
- Men's doubles: (Chinese Taipei) Liao Cheng-ting (Chinese Taipei) Lin Yun-ju
- Women's doubles: (Japan) Satsuki Odo (Japan) Saki Shibata
- Mixed doubles: (Chinese Taipei) Lin Yun-ju (Chinese Taipei) Cheng I-ching

The 2019 Oman Open is the second event of the 2019 ITTF Challenge Series. It takes place from 22–24 March in Muscat, Oman.Lin Yun-ju also claimed a triple crown.

== Men's singles ==
=== Seeds ===
1. (Sweden) Mattias Falck (final)
2. (Chinese Taipei) Chuang Chih-yuan (quarterfinals)
3. (Chinese Taipei) Lin Yun-ju (champion)
4. (India) Sathiyan Gnanasekaran (semifinals)
5. (India) Sharath Kamal (third round)
6. (Germany) Ricardo Walther (third round)
7. (France) Emmanuel Lebesson (quarterfinals)
8. (Brazil) Gustavo Tsuboi (third round)
9. (Portugal) Tiago Apolónia (quarterfinals)
10. (United States) Kanak Jha (third round)
11. (Germany) Bastian Steger (third round)
12. (Kazakhstan) Kirill Gerassimenko (second round)
13. (Slovenia) Bojan Tokič (first round)
14. (Russia) Kirill Skachkov (first round)
15. (Slovakia) Ľubomír Pištej(first round)
16. (Japan) Kazuhiro Yoshimura (first round)
17. (Iran) Nima Alamian(second round)
18. (Chinese Taipei) Liao Cheng-ting (first round)
19. (Iran) Noshad Alamian (quarterfinals)
20. (Croatia) Tomislav Pucar (semifinals)
21. (Italy) Niagol Stoyanov (first round)
22. (France) Can Akkuzu (third round)
23. (Japan) Mizuki Oikawa (first round)
24. (Finland) Benedek Oláh (second round)
25. (Italy) Mihai Bobocica (first round)
26. (Romania) Hunor Szőcs (second round)
27. (Paraguay) Marcelo Aguirre (first round)
28. (Belgium) Florent Lambiet (second round)
29. (Belarus) Aliaksandr Khanin (second round)
30. (Austria) Andreas Levenko (second round)
31. (Oman) Haitham Al-Mandhari (first round)
32. (Oman) Asad Al-Raisi (first round)

=== Draw ===
==== Top half ====
===== Section 1 =====
First round
1	(Sweden) Mattias Falck	11	11	12	13
(Egypt) Khalid Assar	4	5	10	11
(Uzbekistan) Zokhid Kenjaev	13	11	11	8	6	3
17	(Iran) Nima Alamian	11	13	8	11	11	11
28	(Belgium) Florent Lambiet	11	11	11	11
(Kazakhstan) Denis Zholudev	8	7	8	6
(South Korea) Choi Deok-hwa	11	14	11	10	11
13	(Slovenia) Bojan Tokič	9	14	9	12	9
15	(Slovakia) Ľubomír Pištej	11	8	13	8	8	8
(India) Harmeet Desai	8	11	11	11	11	11
(Slovakia) Thomas Keinath	8	8	6	6
19	(Iran) Noshad Alamian	11	11	11	11
25	(Italy) Mihai Bobocica	9	11	11	6	9	11	8
(India) Manav Vikash Thakkar	11	9	5	11	11	5	11
(Slovakia) Samuel Novota	11	8	3	5	10
6	(Germany) Ricardo Walther	6	11	11	11	12

Second round
1	(Sweden) Mattias Falck	9	11	8	11	11	11	12
17	(Iran) Nima Alamian	11	9	11	13	6	9	10
28	(Belgium) Florent Lambiet	8	8	8	6
(South Korea) Choi Deok-hwa	11	11	11	11
(India) Harmeet Desai	8	5	2	9
19	(Iran) Noshad Alamian	11	11	11	11
(India) Manav Vikash Thakkar	7	10	8	4
6	(Germany) Ricardo Walther	11	12	11	11

Third round
1	(Sweden) Mattias Falck	11	9	11	11	9	11
(South Korea) Choi Deok-hwa	3	11	3	9	11	7
19	(Iran) Noshad Alamian	11	5	5	11	11	11
6	(Germany) Ricardo Walther	6	11	11	7	5	9

Quarterfinals
1	(Sweden) Mattias Falck	11	11	11	11
19	(Iran) Noshad Alamian	5	8	7	9

===== Section 2 =====
First round
7	(France) Emmanuel Lebesson	11	11	11	11
(Singapore) Poh Shao Feng Ethan	7	8	6	9
(Japan) Takuya Jin	11	11	11	11
32	(Oman) Asad Al-Raisi	5	5	4	3
22	(France) Can Akkuzu	9	11	11	8	11	7	11
(Chinese Taipei) Peng Wang-wei	11	7	7	11	7	11	9
(Belarus) Pavel Platonov	7	11	13	10	6	6
12	(Kazakhstan) Kirill Gerassimenko	11	5	11	12	11	11
14	(Russia) Kirill Skachkov	14	11	6	9	5	7
(India) Anthony Amalraj	12	5	11	11	11	11
(France) Tristan Flore	11	11	12	5	11	11
27	(Paraguay) Marcelo Aguirre	8	4	14	11	5	8
29	(Belarus) Aliaksandr Khanin	12	11	11	2	6	3	11
(France) Alexandre Cassin	10	5	6	11	11	11	4
(Belgium) Martin Allegro	8	9	11	8	11	10
4	(India) Sathiyan Gnanasekaran	11	11	6	11	6	12

Second round
7	(France) Emmanuel Lebesson	11	5	11	11	6	12
(Japan) Takuya Jin	2	11	9	3	11	10
22	(France) Can Akkuzu	11	11	11	11
12	(Kazakhstan) Kirill Gerassimenko	5	9	9	5
(India) Anthony Amalraj	11	14	11	11
(France) Tristan Flore	6	12	7	8
29	(Belarus) Aliaksandr Khanin	11	7	9	8	7
4	(India) Sathiyan Gnanasekaran	7	11	11	11	11

Third round
7	(France) Emmanuel Lebesson	8	11	8	11	9	11	11
22	(France) Can Akkuzu	11	7	11	7	11	8	9
(India) Anthony Amalraj	11	5	7	4	4
4	(India) Sathiyan Gnanasekaran	6	11	11	11	11

Quarterfinals
7	(France) Emmanuel Lebesson	9	7	9	11	10
4	(India) Sathiyan Gnanasekaran	11	11	11	6	12

==== Bottom half ====
===== Section 3 =====
First round
3	(Chinese Taipei) Lin Yun-ju	11	11	11	11
(Austria) David Serdaroglu	8	1	9	3
(Egypt) Mohamed El-Beiali	11	7	9	11	11	4	6
26	(Romania) Hunor Szőcs	7	11	11	7	6	11	11
23	(Japan) Mizuki Oikawa	10	12	6	9	10
(Croatia) Frane Kojic	12	10	11	11	12
(Egypt) Ahmed Saleh	7	7	11	4	4
11	(Germany) Bastian Steger	11	11	8	11	11
9	(Portugal) Tiago Apolónia	10	11	11	11	11	11
(Russia) Denis Ivonin	12	13	3	5	5	9
(Saudi Arabia) Ali Al-Khadrawi	3	7	8	11	8
30	(Austria) Andreas Levenko	11	11	11	6	11
18	(Chinese Taipei) Liao Cheng-ting	10	5	8	15	6
(Slovakia) Alexander Valuch	12	11	11	13	11
(Saudi Arabia) Naif Al-Jadai	8	11	9	5	2
8	(Brazil) Gustavo Tsuboi	11	3	11	11	11

Second round
3	(Chinese Taipei) Lin Yun-ju	8	11	11	11	11
26	(Romania) Hunor Szőcs	11	1	2	1	9
(Croatia) Frane Kojic	11	11	5	8	11	4	6
11	(Germany) Bastian Steger	9	6	11	11	3	11	11
9	(Portugal) Tiago Apolónia	6	6	11	11	11	11
30	(Austria) Andreas Levenko	11	11	7	6	5	5
(Slovakia) Alexander Valuch	8	7	8	9
8	(Brazil) Gustavo Tsuboi	11	11	11	11

Third round
3	(Chinese Taipei) Lin Yun-ju	11	11	12	11
11	(Germany) Bastian Steger	2	8	10	9
9	(Portugal) Tiago Apolónia	11	12	5	7	15	11	11
8	(Brazil) Gustavo Tsuboi	8	10	11	11	17	2	8

Quarterfinals
3	(Chinese Taipei) Lin Yun-ju	11	11	11	11
9	(Portugal) Tiago Apolónia	8	9	9	9

===== Section 4 =====
First round
5	(India) Sharath Kamal	11	11	11	11
(South Korea) Kim Byung-hyeon	9	6	6	8
(Russia) Artur Abusev	6	9	1	7
24	(Finland) Benedek Oláh	11	11	11	11
20	(Croatia) Tomislav Pucar	11	10	11	11	11
(Germany) Patrick Baum	7	12	8	6	5
(Ecuador) Alberto Miño	11	16	11	6	11	11
16	(Japan) Kazuhiro Yoshimura	8	14	13	11	8	5
10	(United States) Kanak Jha	11	9	11	11	11
(Singapore) Chew Zhe Yu Clarence	4	11	3	7	1
(Russia) Alexey Liventsov	5	11	11	6	11	9	11
21	(Italy) Niagol Stoyanov	11	9	8	11	8	11	5
31	(Oman) Haitham Al-Mandhari	4	5	5	4
(Russia) Vladimir Sidorenko	11	11	11	11
(Russia) Aleksandr Tiutriumov	5	6	12	10	9
2	(Chinese Taipei) Chuang Chih-yuan	11	11	10	12	11

Second round
5	(India) Sharath Kamal	9	11	11	9	11	14
24	(Finland) Benedek Oláh	11	7	8	11	7	12
20	(Croatia) Tomislav Pucar	11	11	11	11
(Ecuador) Alberto Miño	3	3	6	9
10	(United States) Kanak Jha	12	20	11	5	8	11
(Russia) Alexey Liventsov	10	18	7	11	11	6
(Russia) Vladimir Sidorenko	4	6	9	14	11	5
2	(Chinese Taipei) Chuang Chih-yuan	11	11	11	12	9	11

Third round
5	(India) Sharath Kamal	10	4	11	6	10
20	(Croatia) Tomislav Pucar	12	11	8	11	12
10	(United States) Kanak Jha	5	5	12	8
2	(Chinese Taipei) Chuang Chih-yuan	11	11	14	11

Quarterfinals
20	(Croatia) Tomislav Pucar	14	11	7	8	10	11	11
2	(Chinese Taipei) Chuang Chih-yuan	12	7	11	11	12	5	6

==== Finals ====
Semifinals									Final
1	(Sweden) Mattias Falck	11	7	11	9	11	9	12
4	(India) Sathiyan Gnanasekaran	8	11	9	11	9	11	10	1	(Sweden) Mattias Falck	5	11	7	7	11	8
3	(Chinese Taipei) Lin Yun-ju	11	11	13	8	11	8	11	3	(Chinese Taipei) Lin Yun-ju	11	8	11	11	8	11
20	(Croatia) Tomislav Pucar	4	7	15	11	6	11	8

== Women's singles ==
=== Seeds ===
1. (Chinese Taipei) Cheng I-ching (final)
2. (Japan) Miu Hirano (semifinals)
3. (Japan) Hitomi Sato (semifinals)
4. (Japan) Saki Shibata (second round)
5. (Romania) Bernadette Szőcs (quarterfinals)
6. (Japan) Honoka Hashimoto (quarterfinals)
7. (Germany) Petrissa Solja (first round)
8. (Thailand) Suthasini Sawettabut (quarterfinals)
9. (Japan) Hina Hayata (champion)
10. (United States) Yue Wu (first round)
11. (Russia) Polina Mikhaylova (first round)
12. (Chinese Taipei) Cheng Hsien-tzu (second round)
13. (Egypt) Dina Meshref (second round)
14. (Japan) Satsuki Odo (second round)
15. (Singapore) Zeng Jian (first round)
16. (Singapore) Lin Ye (second round)

=== Draw ===
==== Top half ====
First round
1	(Chinese Taipei) Cheng I-ching	11	15	12	15
(Singapore) Wong Xin Ru	6	13	10	13
(India) Madhurika Patkar	4	9	6	4
16	(Singapore) Lin Ye	11	11	11	11
14	(Japan) Satsuki Odo	6	9	11	11	11	11
(Belarus) Nadezhda Bogdanova	11	11	9	4	7	8
(Chinese Taipei) Lin Chia-hsuan	7	5	5	4
6	(Japan) Honoka Hashimoto	11	11	11	11
8	(Thailand) Suthasini Sawettabut	9	11	11	11	6	11
(Russia) Mariia Tailakova	11	7	6	5	11	6
(France) Laura Gasnier	11	11	7	11	9	9
13	(Egypt) Dina Meshref	8	6	11	13	11	11
11	(Russia) Polina Mikhaylova	11	8	10	8	1
(Belarus) Daria Trigolos	6	11	12	11	11
(India) Riti Shankar	4	3	4	6
3	(Japan) Hitomi Sato	11	11	11	11

Second round
1	(Chinese Taipei) Cheng I-ching	11	11	11	11
16	(Singapore) Lin Ye	9	5	7	8
14	(Japan) Satsuki Odo	6	6	5	3
6	(Japan) Honoka Hashimoto	11	11	11	11
8	(Thailand) Suthasini Sawettabut	11	6	11	11	11
13	(Egypt) Dina Meshref	8	11	9	6	9
(Belarus) Daria Trigolos	9	6	11	11	10	4
3	(Japan) Hitomi Sato	11	11	5	9	12	11

Quarterfinals
1	(Chinese Taipei) Cheng I-ching	3	14	4	5	11	11	11
6	(Japan) Honoka Hashimoto	11	12	11	11	9	7	8
8	(Thailand) Suthasini Sawettabut	2	11	11	0	1	8
3	(Japan) Hitomi Sato	11	8	9	11	11	11

Semifinals
1	(Chinese Taipei) Cheng I-ching	11	11	9	11	13	11
3	(Japan) Hitomi Sato	8	8	11	7	15	8

==== Bottom half ====
First round
4	(Japan) Saki Shibata	11	11	11	12
(Kazakhstan) Anastassiya Lavrova	5	3	2	10
(Russia) Yana Noskova	3	7	8	14	8
9	(Japan) Hina Hayata	11	11	11	12	11
15	(Singapore) Zeng Jian	12	8	5	1	8
(Japan) Sakura Mori	10	11	11	11	11
(Slovakia) Tatiana Kukulkova	2	5	7	7
5	(Romania) Bernadette Szőcs	11	11	11	11
7	(Germany) Petrissa Solja	9	11	11	11	8	3	8
(Belarus) Viktoria Pavlovich	11	6	5	2	11	11	11
(Russia) Valeria Shcherbatykh	11	11	11	13	9	6	3
12	(Chinese Taipei) Cheng Hsien-tzu	5	13	6	11	11	11	11
10	(United States) Yue Wu	6	11	6	9	9
(Japan) Maki Shiomi	11	6	11	11	11
(Egypt) Farah Abdel-Aziz	5	6	9	6
2	(Japan) Miu Hirano	11	11	11	11

Second round
4	(Japan) Saki Shibata	12	6	12	9	7
9	(Japan) Hina Hayata	10	11	14	11	11
(Japan) Sakura Mori	5	4	11	6	7
5	(Romania) Bernadette Szőcs	11	11	7	11	11
(Belarus) Viktoria Pavlovich	3	11	11	7	7	11	15
12	(Chinese Taipei) Cheng Hsien-tzu	11	5	9	11	11	9	13
(Japan) Maki Shiomi	6	9	4	11	4
2	(Japan) Miu Hirano	11	11	11	7	11

Quarterfinals
9	(Japan) Hina Hayata	11	11	11	11
5	(Romania) Bernadette Szőcs	6	6	3	7
(Belarus) Viktoria Pavlovich	2	3	6	4
2	(Japan) Miu Hirano	11	11	11	11

Semifinals
9	(Japan) Hina Hayata	11	11	10	11	11
2	(Japan) Miu Hirano	6	7	12	8	5

==== Finals ====
Semifinals								Final
1	(Chinese Taipei) Cheng I-ching	11	11	9	11	13	11
3	(Japan) Hitomi Sato	8	8	11	7	15	8	1	(Chinese Taipei) Cheng I-ching	3	5	11	9	8
9	(Japan) Hina Hayata	11	11	10	11	11		9	(Japan) Hina Hayata	11	11	7	11	11
2	(Japan) Miu Hirano	6	7	12	8	5

== Men's doubles ==
=== Seeds ===
1. (Chinese Taipei) Liao Cheng-ting / Lin Yun-ju (champions)
2. (Belgium) Martin Allegro / Florent Lambiet (semifinals)
3. (India) Sharath Kamal / Sathiyan Gnanasekaran (quarterfinals)
4. (France) Tristan Flore / Emmanuel Lebesson (quarterfinals)
5. (Egypt) Mohamed El-Beiali / Ahmed Saleh (first round)
6. (India) Harmeet Desai / Manav Vikash Thakkar (first round)
7. (Belarus) Aliaksandr Khanin / Pavel Platonov (first round)
8. (Oman) Haitham Al-Mandhari / Asad Al-Raisi (first round)

=== Draw ===
First round
1	(Chinese Taipei) Liao Cheng-ting (Chinese Taipei) Lin Yun-ju	12	11	11	11
(Russia) Alexey Liventsov (Russia) Kirill Skachkov	10	13	7	5
(Slovakia) Samuel Kaluzny (Slovakia) Ľubomír Pištej	14	11	11
5	(Egypt) Mohamed El-Beiali (Egypt) Ahmed Saleh	12	6	9
7	(Belarus) Aliaksandr Khanin (Belarus) Pavel Platonov	10	8	11	11	9
(Japan) Takuya Jin (Japan) Mizuki Oikawa	12	11	1	6	11
(Italy) Mihai Bobocica (Italy) Niagol Stoyanov	10	11	11	11	14
4	(France) Tristan Flore (France) Emmanuel Lebesson	12	9	13	5	16
3	(India) Sharath Kamal (India) Sathiyan Gnanasekaran	9	11	11	12
(France) Can Akkuzu (France) Alexandre Cassin	11	5	9	10
(Russia) Denis Ivonin (Russia) Vladimir Sidorenko	11	11	11
8	(Oman) Haitham Al-Mandhari (Oman) Asad Al-Raisi	1	2	6
6	(India) Harmeet Desai (India) Manav Vikash Thakkar	7	11	8	9
(Paraguay) Marcelo Aguirre (Ecuador) Alberto Miño	11	9	11	11
(Singapore) Pang Yew En Koen (Singapore) Poh Shao Feng Ethan	6	5	5
2	(Belgium) Martin Allegro (Belgium) Florent Lambiet	11	11	11

Quarterfinals
1	(Chinese Taipei) Liao Cheng-ting (Chinese Taipei) Lin Yun-ju	14	11	7	11
(Slovakia) Samuel Kaluzny (Slovakia) Ľubomír Pištej	12	3	11	6
(Japan) Takuya Jin (Japan) Mizuki Oikawa	16	10	11	12
4	(France) Tristan Flore (France) Emmanuel Lebesson	14	12	7	10
3	(India) Sharath Kamal (India) Sathiyan Gnanasekaran	6	11	7	11	10
(Russia) Denis Ivonin (Russia) Vladimir Sidorenko	11	7	11	7	12
(Paraguay) Marcelo Aguirre (Ecuador) Alberto Miño
2	(Belgium) Martin Allegro (Belgium) Florent Lambiet	w/o

Semifinals
1	(Chinese Taipei) Liao Cheng-ting (Chinese Taipei) Lin Yun-ju	13	15	14
(Japan) Takuya Jin (Japan) Mizuki Oikawa	11	13	12
(Russia) Denis Ivonin (Russia) Vladimir Sidorenko	11	9	5	11	11
2	(Belgium) Martin Allegro (Belgium) Florent Lambiet	7	11	11	4	7

Final
1	(Chinese Taipei) Liao Cheng-ting (Chinese Taipei) Lin Yun-ju	11	11	11
(Russia) Denis Ivonin (Russia) Vladimir Sidorenko	8	3	7

== Women's doubles ==
=== Seeds ===
1. (Japan) Honoka Hashimoto / Hitomi Sato (final)
2. (Japan) Satsuki Odo / Saki Shibata (champions)
3. (Thailand) Suthasini Sawettabut / (United States) Yue Wu (semifinals)
4. (Russia) Yana Noskova / Mariia Tailakova (semifinals)
5. (Egypt) Farah Abdel-Aziz / Reem El-Eraky (first round)
6. (Chinese Taipei) Cheng Hsien-tzu / (France) Marie Migot (quarterfinals)
7. (Singapore) Goi Rui Xuan / Zeng Jian (first round)
8. (Chinese Taipei) Lin Chia-hsuan / Su Pei-ling (first round)

=== Draw ===
First round
1	(Japan) Honoka Hashimoto (Japan) Hitomi Sato	11	11	11
(Kazakhstan) Gulchekhra Khusseinova (Kazakhstan) Anastassiya Lavrova	4	1	5
(Singapore) Wong Xin Ru (Singapore) Zhang Wanling	5	9	11	4
6	(Chinese Taipei) Cheng Hsien-tzu (France) Marie Migot	11	11	8	11
8	(Chinese Taipei) Lin Chia-hsuan (France) Su Pei-ling	8	3	11
(Slovakia) Tatiana Kukulkova (Slovakia) Eva Ódorová	11	11	13
(Belarus) Nadezhda Bogdanova (Belarus) Daria Trigolos	5	17	7
3	(Thailand) Suthasini Sawettabut (United States) Yue Wu	11	19	11
4	(Russia) Yana Noskova (Russia) Mariia Tailakova	11	11	11
(Singapore) Lim Eunice (Singapore) Tan En Hui	5	6	4
(Kazakhstan) Zauresh Akasheva (Poland) Magdalena Sikorska	11	11	13
5	(Egypt) Farah Abdel-Aziz (Egypt) Reem El-Eraky	6	8	11
7	(Singapore) Goi Rui Xuan (Singapore) Zeng Jian	11	3	11	11	7
(Iran) Mahshid Ashtari (Iran) Neda Shahsavari	4	11	4	13	11
(India) Garima Goyal (India) Riti Shankar	4	4	11	5
2	(Japan) Satsuki Odo (Japan) Saki Shibata	11	11	9	11

Quarterfinals
1	(Japan) Honoka Hashimoto (Japan) Hitomi Sato	11	9	11	11
(Chinese Taipei) Cheng Hsien-tzu (France) Marie Migot	9	11	4	8
(Slovakia) Tatiana Kukulkova (Slovakia) Eva Ódorová	11	7	5	6
3	(Thailand) Suthasini Sawettabut (United States) Yue Wu	8	11	11	11
4	(Russia) Yana Noskova (Russia) Mariia Tailakova	w/o
(Kazakhstan) Zauresh Akasheva (Poland) Magdalena Sikorska
(Iran) Mahshid Ashtari (Iran) Neda Shahsavari	5	11	8
2	(Japan) Satsuki Odo (Japan) Saki Shibata	11	13	11

Semifinals
1	(Japan) Honoka Hashimoto (Japan) Hitomi Sato	11	11	11
3	(Thailand) Suthasini Sawettabut (United States) Yue Wu	6	3	9
4	(Russia) Yana Noskova (Russia) Mariia Tailakova	7	6	14
2	(Japan) Satsuki Odo (Japan) Saki Shibata	11	11	16

Final
1	(Japan) Honoka Hashimoto (Japan) Hitomi Sato	12	5	11	6
2	(Japan) Satsuki Odo (Japan) Saki Shibata	14	11	9	11

== Mixed doubles ==
=== Seeds ===
1. (Chinese Taipei) Lin Yun-ju / Cheng I-ching (champions)
2. (Slovakia) Ľubomír Pištej / Tatiana Kukuľková (first round)
3. (United States) Kanak Jha / Yue Wu (quarterfinals)
4. (Romania) Hunor Szőcs / Bernadette Szőcs (quarterfinals)
5. (France) Tristan Flore / Laura Gasnier (semifinals)
6. (India) Harmeet Desai / Madhurika Patkar (quarterfinals)
7. (India) Sathiyan Gnanasekaran / Archana Girish Kamath (first round)
8. (Belarus) Aliaksandr Khanin / Daria Trigolos (quarterfinals)

=== Draw ===
First round
1	(Chinese Taipei) Lin Yun-ju (Chinese Taipei) Cheng I-ching	10	11	11	11
(Singapore) Pang Yew En Koen (Singapore) Wong Xin Ru	12	7	4	4
(Russia) Kirill Skachkov (Russia) Valeria Shcherbatykh	7	6	18	16
8	(Belarus) Aliaksandr Khanin (Belarus) Daria Trigolos	11	11	16	18
5	(France) Tristan Flore (France) Laura Gasnier	9	11	6	11	11
(Singapore) Tan Lucas (Singapore) Goi Rui Xuan	11	9	11	2	7
(Singapore) Poh Shao Feng Ethan (Singapore) Zeng Jian	7	9	11	14
4	(Romania) Hunor Szőcs (Romania) Bernadette Szőcs	11	11	9	16
3	(United States) Kanak Jha (United States) Yue Wu	10	11	9	11	11
(Slovakia) Samuel Kaluzny (Slovakia) Eva Ódorová	12	5	11	5	5
(Russia) Vladimir Sidorenko (Russia) Mariia Tailakova	6	10	11	13	12
7	(India) Sathiyan Gnanasekaran (India) Archana Girish Kamath	11	12	7	11	10
6	(India) Harmeet Desai (India) Madhurika Patkar	16	11	10	11
(Kazakhstan) Aidos Kenzhigulov (Kazakhstan) Zauresh Akasheva	14	5	12	9
(Singapore) Chew Zhe Yu Clarence (Singapore) Lin Ye	11	11	10	8	11
2	(Slovakia) Ľubomír Pištej (Slovakia) Tatiana Kukuľková	3	1	12	11	9

Quarterfinals
1	(Chinese Taipei) Lin Yun-ju (Chinese Taipei) Cheng I-ching	11	11	8	11
8	(Belarus) Aliaksandr Khanin (Belarus) Daria Trigolos	6	7	11	5
5	(France) Tristan Flore (France) Laura Gasnier	11	11	11
4	(Romania) Hunor Szőcs (Romania) Bernadette Szőcs	8	3	9
3	(United States) Kanak Jha (United States) Yue Wu	11	5	10	8
(Russia) Vladimir Sidorenko (Russia) Mariia Tailakova	6	11	12	11
6	(India) Harmeet Desai (India) Madhurika Patkar	6	12	5
(Singapore) Chew Zhe Yu Clarence (Singapore) Lin Ye	11	14	11

Semifinals
1	(Chinese Taipei) Lin Yun-ju (Chinese Taipei) Cheng I-ching	9	11	11	17
5	(France) Tristan Flore (France) Laura Gasnier	11	7	4	15
(Russia) Vladimir Sidorenko (Russia) Mariia Tailakova	11	11	11	11
(Singapore) Chew Zhe Yu Clarence (Singapore) Lin Ye	8	13	9	6

Final
1	(Chinese Taipei) Lin Yun-ju (Chinese Taipei) Cheng I-ching	7	11	11	11
(Russia) Vladimir Sidorenko (Russia) Mariia Tailakova	11	6	6	8
