= 2019 Thailand Open (table tennis) =

Tournament details
- Dates: 24–26 May 2019
- Competitors: 64S / 16D
- Total prize money: US$30,000
- Location: Bangkok, Thailand

Champions
- Men's singles: (Germany) Ruwen Filus
- Women's singles: (Japan) Hitomi Sato
- Men's doubles: (Germany) Ruwen Filus (Germany) Steffen Mengel
- Women's doubles: (Japan) Satsuki Odo (Japan) Saki Shibata

The 2019 Thailand Open is the seventh event of the 2019 ITTF Challenge Series. It takes place from 24 to 26 May in Bangkok, Thailand.

== Men's singles ==
=== Seeds ===
1. (Japan) Jin Ueda (second round)
2. (Japan) Kenta Matsudaira (quarter-finals)
3. (Germany) Ruwen Filus (champion)
4. (Japan) Mizuki Oikawa (third round)
5. (Thailand) Supanut Wisutmaythangkoon (second round)
6. (India) Harmeet Desai (first round)
7. (Scotland) Gavin Rumgay (second round)
8. (Uzbekistan) Zokhid Kenjaev (first round)
9. (Thailand) Padasak Tanviriyavechakul (second round)
10. (France) Andrea Landrieu (semi-finals)
11. (Chinese Taipei) Yang Heng-wei (second round)
12. (Japan) Kohei Sambe (second round)
13. (Japan) Yuta Tanaka (semi-finals)
14. (Germany) Kilian Ort (third round)
15. (Italy) Leonardo Mutti (second round)
16. (Chinese Taipei) Sun Chia-hung (first round)
17. (Singapore) Ethan Poh (first round)
18. (Japan) Masaki Takami (first round)
19. (Germany) Tobias Hippler (second round)
20. (South Korea) Baek Ho-gyun (third round)
21. (Canada) Jeremy Hazin (second round)
22. (Chinese Taipei) Feng Yi-hsin (second round)
23. (Germany) Steffen Mengel (second round)
24. (Singapore) Clarence Chew (second round)
25. (Chinese Taipei) Li hsin-yang (first round)
26. (India) Raj Mondal (first round)
27. (Chinese Taipei) Wang Tai-wei (quarter-finals)
28. (Thailand) Pattaratorm Passara (first round)
29. (India) Mudit Dani (first round)
30. (Singapore) Koen Pang (first round)
31. (Chinese Taipei) Lai Chi-chien (first round)
32. (India) Ronit Bhanja (first round)

=== Draw ===
==== Finals ====
Semifinals
(South Korea) Seo Hyun-deok	11	11	7	10	12	4	11
13	(Japan) Yuta Tanaka	8	7	11	12	10	11	3
3	(Germany) Ruwen Filus	11	11	11	5	10	8	11
10	(France) Andrea Landrieu	8	9	9	11	12	11	5

Final
(South Korea) Seo Hyun-deok	6	11	8	8	11	8
3	(Germany) Ruwen Filus	11	7	11	11	9	11

==== Top half ====
===== Section 1 =====
First round
1	(Japan) J Ueda	11	11	11	11
(Singapore) Beh K T	8	9	5	6
(South Korea) Park G-t	11	9	12	11	12
32	(India) R Bhanja	7	11	10	8	10
31	(Chinese Taipei) Lai C-c	2	8	11	11	9	5
(South Korea) Cho J-j	11	11	5	9	11	11
(India) A Yadav	4	11	13	8	7
11	(Chinese Taipei) Yang H-w	11	8	15	11	11
16	(Chinese Taipei) Sun C-h	9	11	5	7	11	11	10
(South Korea) Hwang J-h	11	7	11	11	4	5	12
(Senegal) I Diaw	11	11	11	11
17	(Singapore) Eathan Poh	4	7	5	7
25	(Chinese Taipei) Li H-y	7	9	11	3	13	3
(South Korea) Seo H-d	11	11	9	11	11	11
(Italy) G Piciulin	6	13	4	9	2
7	(Scotland) G Rumgay	11	11	11	11	11

Second round
1	(Japan) J Ueda	11	14	15	9	11	4	5
(South Korea) Park G-t	6	16	13	11	5	11	11
(South Korea) Cho J-j	11	11	11	7	11
11	(Chinese Taipei) Yang H-w	9	7	7	11	9
(South Korea) Hwang J-h	11	12	6	4	12	7
(Senegal) I Diaw	7	14	11	11	10	11
(South Korea) Seo H-d	11	11	11	11
7	(Scotland) G Rumgay	5	8	2	9

Third round
(South Korea) Park G-t	11	10	9	10	8
(South Korea) Cho J-j	8	12	11	12	11
(Senegal) I Diaw	5	12	7	6	8
(South Korea) Seo H-d	11	10	11	11	11

Quarterfinals
(South Korea) Cho J-j	7	6	8	7
(South Korea) Seo H-d	11	11	11	11

===== Section 2 =====
First round
8	(Uzbekistan) Z Kenjaev	11	9	11	7	11	10	11
(Japan) T Ichinose	9	11	7	11	6	12	13
(Japan) A Machi	7	7	11	6	4
27	(Chinese Taipei) Wang T-w	11	11	8	11	11
22	(Chinese Taipei) Feng Y-h	11	17	12	11
(Slovakia) T Keinath	7	15	10	9
(India) S Suravajjula	4	11	11	9	6
14	(Germany) K Ort	11	9	13	11	11
13	(Japan) Y Tanaka	6	11	11	5	11	11
(South Korea) Jung Y-h	11	7	7	11	9	8
(South Korea) Seo H-c	6	9	4	3
23	(Germany) S Mengel	11	11	11	11
19	(Germany) T Hippler	9	11	11	11	11
(United States) Tian Y	11	9	7	7	3
(India) M U Sham	3	9	5	9
4	(Japan) M Oikawa	11	11	11	11

Second round
(Japan) T Ichinose	12	16	9	10	5	2
27	(Chinese Taipei) Wang T-w	10	14	11	12	11	11
22	(Chinese Taipei) Feng Y-h	15	8	14	14	3
14	(Germany) K Ort	17	11	16	12	11
13	(Japan) Y Tanaka	11	11	9	8	11	7	12
23	(Germany) S Mengel	8	6	11	11	2	11	10
19	(Germany) T Hippler	2	11	5	8	7
4	(Japan) M Oikawa	11	7	11	11	11

Third round
27	(Chinese Taipei) Wang T-w	5	8	11	8	11	11	11
14	(Germany) K Ort	11	11	5	11	9	9	7
13	(Japan) Y Tanaka	11	7	12	4	15	11	13
4	(Japan) Mizuki Oikawa	8	14	11	11	13	9	11

Quarterfinals
27	(Chinese Taipei) Wang T-w	8	5	11	8	11	7
13	(Japan) Y Tanaka	11	11	6	11	9	11

==== Bottom half ====
===== Section 3 =====
First round
3	(Germany) R Filus	11	11	11	11
(India) S Pande	3	7	9	4
(Thailand) Y Panagitgun	11	11	11	11
29	(India) M Dani	4	9	7	7
26	(India) R Mondal	11	10	3	5	4
(France) A-K Salifou	3	12	11	11	11
(India) G Grover	7	10	9	11	13	9
9	(Thailand) P Tanviriyavechakul	11	12	11	7	11	11
12	(Japan) K Sambe	13	8	11	11	11
(South Korea) Park J-w	11	11	9	8	8
(Chinese Taipei) Yeh C-w	11	10	8	11	7	12	11
30	(Singapore) K Pang	8	12	11	4	11	10	8
18	(Japan) M Takami	9	11	5	11	7	4
(South Korea) Oh M-s	11	2	11	8	11	11
(India) B Boro	8	9	11	12	8
5	(Thailand) S Wisutmayhangkoon	11	11	6	14	11

Second round
3	(Germany) R Filus	16	11	11	11
(Thailand) Y Panagitgun	14	6	6	5
(France) A-K Salifou	11	12	11	6	5	11
9	(Thailand) P Tanviriyavechakul	6	10	8	11	11	7
12	(Japan) K Sambe	5	13	6	12	9
(Chinese Taipei) Yeh C-w	11	15	11	10	11
(South Korea) Oh M-s	11	10	12	11	12
5	(Thailand) S Wisutmayhangkoon	8	12	10	7	10

Third round
3	(Germany) R Filus	13	6	10	11	11	11	11
(France) A-K Salifou	15	12	11	9	8	8	4
(Chinese Taipei) Yeh C-w	11	6	12	11	11
(South Korea) Oh M-s	4	11	10	7	7

Quarterfinals
3	(Germany) R Filus	11	11	11	11
(Chinese Taipei) Yeh C-w	5	8	5	9

===== Section 4 =====
First round
6	(India) H Desai	11	8	14	11	7	11	9
(Chinese Taipei) Huang Y-c	7	11	16	3	11	4	11
(Chinese Taipei) Tsai C-y	8	6	11	9	8
21	(Canada) J Hazin	11	11	8	11	11
28	(Thailand) P Passara	13	11	8	9	8	4
(South Korea) Kim J-w	11	9	11	11	11	11
(Chinese Taipei) Chen C-h	6	5	6	8
10	(France) A Landrieu	11	11	11	11
15	(Italy) L Mutti	12	9	9	14	14	11
(Chinese Taipei) Li H-y	10	11	11	12	12	4
(Singapore) G Yu	7	8	10	8
20	(South Korea) Baek H-g	11	11	12	11
24	(Singapore) C Chew	12	12	11	11
(South Korea) Cheon M-h	10	10	8	6
(Chinese Taipei) Tai M-w	12	6	6	3
2	(Japan) K Matsudaira	14	11	11	11

Second round
(Chinese Taipei) Huang Y-c	11	7	8	11	13	11
21	(Canada) J Hazin	3	11	11	6	11	7
(South Korea) Kim J-w	8	1	7	6
10	(France) A Landrieu	11	11	11	11
15	(Italy) L Mutti	11	3	11	9	13	5	5
20	(South Korea) Baek H-g	8	11	9	11	11	11	11
24	(Singapore) C Chew	6	2	4	6
2	(Japan) K Matsudaira	11	11	11	11

Third round
(Chinese Taipei) Huang Y-c	11	5	11	7	7
10	(France) A Landrieu	8	11	13	11	11
20	(South Korea) Baek H-g	11	4	6	5	10
2	(Japan) K Matsudaira	6	11	11	11	12

Quarterfinals
10	(France) A Landrieu	11	11	11	12
2	(Japan) K Matsudaira	5	2	8	10

== Women's singles ==
=== Seeds ===
1. (Japan) Hitomi Sato (champion)
2. (Japan) Saki Shibata (final)
3. (Japan) Honoka Hashimoto (semi-finals)
4. (Thailand) Suthasini Sawettabut (quarter-finals)
5. (Japan) Satsuki Odo (second round)
6. (Japan) Maki Shiomi (third round)
7. (Japan) Sakura Mori (semi-finals)
8. (India) Ayhika Mukherjee (second round)
9. (India) Madhurika Patkar (second round)
10. (Chinese Taipei) Lin Chia-hsuan (first round)
11. (Thailand) Nanthana Komwong (second round)
12. (South Korea) Yoon Hyo-bin (third round)
13. (Chinese Taipei) Huang Yu-wen (second round)
14. (Thailand) Orawan Paranang (quarter-finals)
15. (Chinese Taipei) Li Yu-jhun (first round)
16. (Malaysia) Ho Ying (first round)
17. (Chinese Taipei) Liu Hsing-yin (second round)
18. (Thailand) Tamolwan Khetkhuan (withdraw)
19. (Japan) Shiho Matsudaira (third round)
20. (Malaysia) Alice Chang (first round)
21. (South Korea) Lee na-kyung (third round)
22. (South Korea) Kim Ming-yung (first round)
23. (South Korea) Sim Hyun-ju (second round)
24. (South Korea) Kim Ha-eun (first round)
25. (Malaysia) Lyne Karen (first round)
26. (India) Divya Deshpande (first round)
27. (India) Sreeja Akula (first round)
28. (Singapore) Goi Rui Xuan (second round)
29. (South Korea) Kang Da-yeon (first round)
30. (Singapore) Tan En Hui (first round)
31. (South Korea) Kim Ji-min (first round)
32. (Chinese Taipei) Huang Hsin (first round)

=== Draw ===
==== Finals ====
Semifinals
1	(Japan) Hitomi Sato	11	7	11	11	2	10	11
3	(Japan) Honoka Hashimoto	5	11	5	3	11	12	4
7	(Japan) Sakura Mori	7	11	11	10	7	9
2	(Japan) Saki Shibata	11	5	9	12	11	11

Final
1	(Japan) Hitomi Sato	5	11	9	6	11	11	11
2	(Japan) Saki Shibata	11	5	11	11	8	9	7

==== Top half ====
===== Section 1 =====
First round
1	(Japan) H Sato	11	11	11	11
(Singapore) J Tan	2	3	0	3
(South Korea) Kim Y-d	14	11	10	12	11	11
25	(Malaysia) K Lyne	16	5	12	10	6	9
32	(Chinese Taipei) Huang H	11	5	11	5	8	10
(India) S Mukherjee	9	11	9	11	11	12
(Hong Kong) Wong C Y	9	6	9	11
12	(South Korea) Yoon H-b	11	11	11	13
16	(Malaysia) Ho Y	11	11	8	9	7	7
(Thailand) J Sawettabut	6	9	11	11	11	11
(Japan) M Kimura	11	11	11	11
20	(Malaysia) A Chang	7	1	7	6
21	(South Korea) Lee N-k	11	11	6	6	11	11
(France) P Pavade	7	7	11	11	7	9
(Singapore) Lim E	3	7	3	7
5	(Japan) S Odo	11	11	11	11

Second round
1	(Japan) H Sato	11	12	9	4	11	11
(South Korea) Kim Y-d	1	10	11	11	3	6
(India) S Mukherjee	11	9	9	11	7	11	6
12	(South Korea) Yoon H-b	5	11	11	6	11	3	11
(Thailand) J Sawettabut	11	10	4	6	9
(Japan) M Kimura	5	12	11	11	11
21	(South Korea) Lee N-k	11	13	11	6	14
5	(Japan) S Odo	8	11	8	11	12

Third round
1	(Japan) H Sato	11	5	11	5	11	11
12	(South Korea) Yoon H-b	5	11	9	11	6	2
(Japan) M Kimura	11	12	11	9	11
21	(South Korea) Lee N-k	7	10	9	11	4

Quarterfinals
1	(Japan) H Sato	11	11	11	11
(Japan) M Kimura	8	9	6	4

===== Section 2 =====
First round
8	(India) A Mukherjee	11	11	11	9	8	11
(Chinese Taipei) Chu Y-c	6	8	7	11	11	4
(Chinese Taipei) Yu H-t	10	6	11	7	11	11	11
26	(India) D Deshpande	12	11	7	11	6	5	8
27	(India) S Akula	8	9	8	12	11	12	8
(Chinese Taipei) Huang Y-c	11	11	11	10	5	10	11
(South Korea) Lee Dagyeong	7	10	8	7
14	(Thailand) O Paranang	11	12	11	11
9	(India) M Patkar	11	12	11	11
(Hong Kong) Chau W S	6	10	6	7
(Japan) A Morita	11	13	8	1	6	11	11
29	(South Korea) Kang D-y	9	11	11	11	11	9	3
31	(South Korea) Kim J-m	11	14	12	3	7
(Chinese Taipei) Chien T-c	9	16	14	11	11
(India) A Das	5	2	1	4
3	(Japan) H Hashimoto	11	11	11	11

Second round
8	(India) A Mukherjee	6	5	11	1	7
(Chinese Taipei) Yu H-t	11	11	3	11	11
(Chinese Taipei) Huang Y-c	6	11	5	11	7	9
14	(Thailand) O Paranang	11	5	11	9	11	11
9	(India) M Patkar	4	12	7	6	2
(Japan) A Morita	11	10	11	11	11
(Chinese Taipei) Chien T-c	9	3	15	12	6	5
3	(Japan) H Hashimoto	11	11	13	10	11	11

Third round
(Chinese Taipei) Yu H-t	11	11	11	9	8	4	9
14	(Thailand) O Paranang	9	9	9	11	11	11	11
(Japan) A Morita	7	8	8	9
3	(Japan) H Hashimoto	11	11	11	11

Quarterfinals
14	(Thailand) O Paranang	11	8	11	4	5	13	9
3	(Japan) H Hashimoto	8	11	6	11	11	11	11

==== Bottom half ====
===== Section 3 =====
First round
4	(Thailand) S Sawettabut	12	11	11	11
(Singapore) P Koh	10	7	5	8
(India) K Nath	4	6	9	10
17	(Chinese Taipei) Liu H-y	11	11	11	12
19	(Japan) S Matsudaira	11	11	11	11
(South Korea) Jung Dana	5	8	8	7
(Chinese Taipei) Chang J-c	7	9	6	7
11	(Thailand) N Komwong	11	11	11	11
10	(Chinese Taipei) Lin C-h	11	9	7	9	11	5
(France) C Lutz	9	11	11	11	5	11
(Japan) Y Umemura	8	11	9	10	11	15
28	(Singapore) Goi R X	11	4	11	12	6	17
(India) S Selvakumar	8	11	10	14	8	7
(Chinese Taipei) Cai F-e	11	4	12	12	11	11
(Chinese Taipei) Lee W-h	11	10	1	2	7
7	(Japan) S Mori	6	12	11	11	11

Second round
4	(Thailand) S Sawettabut	11	11	8	11	12
17	(Chinese Taipei) Liu H-y	9	7	11	7	10
19	(Japan) S Matsudaira	11	11	4	12	9	7	11
11	(Thailand) N Komwong	8	9	11	10	11	11	6
(France) C Lutz	12	13	11	11
28	(Singapore) Goi R X	10	11	5	5
(Chinese Taipei) Cai F-e	2	7	4	7
7	(Japan) S Mori	11	11	11	11

Third round
4	(Thailand) S Sawettabut	7	11	6	11	11	11
19	(Japan) S Matsudaira	11	7	11	6	4	3
(France) C Lutz	8	7	9	11	11	6
7	(Japan) S Mori	11	11	11	5	6	11

Quarterfinals
4	(Thailand) S Sawettabut	8	5	10	5
7	(Japan) S Mori	11	11	12	11

===== Section 4 =====
First round
6	(Japan) M Shiomi	11	11	8	11	11
(France) I Cok	9	9	11	6	5
(South Korea) Yun Arin	11	11	11	11
30	(Singapore) Tan E H	8	8	3	9
24	(South Korea) Kim H-e	7	11	1	9	2
(Japan) A Narumoto	11	9	11	11	11
(United States) T L Hsieh	5	4	9	8
13	(Chinese Taipei) Huang Y-w	11	11	11	11
15	(Chinese Taipei) Li Y-j	4	7	8	11	6
(South Korea) Hwang Jina	11	11	11	7	11
(United States) R Sung	11	12	5	3	9
23	(South Korea) Sim H-j	8	11	14	11	11
22	(South Korea) Kim M-y	4	8	5	5
(Hong Kong) Lee K Y	11	11	11	11
(Thailand) T Phomma	6	6	8	8
2	(Japan) S Shibata	11	11	11	11

Second round
6	(Japan) M Shiomi	11	5	6	11	11	8	11
(South Korea) Yun Arin	7	11	11	9	8	11	7
(Japan) A Narumoto	11	11	11	14	11
13	(Chinese Taipei) Huang Y-w	3	8	2	16	8
(South Korea) Hwang Jina	3	13	11	11	11
23	(South Korea) Sim H-j	11	11	6	4	9
(Hong Kong) Lee K Y	8	9	11	4	7
2	(Japan) S Shibata	11	11	7	11	11

Third round
6	(Japan) M Shiomi	7	11	6	9	9
(Japan) A Narumoto	11	6	11	11	11
(South Korea) Hwang Jina	10	11	6	9
2	(Japan) S Shibata	12	13	11	11

Quarterfinals
(Japan) A Narumoto	3	9	11	11	4
2	(Japan) S Shibata	11	11	13	8	11

== Men's doubles ==
=== Seeds ===
1. (Germany) Kilian Ort / Tobias Hippler (first round)
2. (Japan) Kenta Matsudaira / Jin Ueda (first round)
3. (Thailand) Padasak Tanviriyavechakul / Supanut Wisutmaythangkoon (semi-finals)
4. (India) Harmeet Desai / Abhishek Yadev (first round)
5. (Germany) Ruwen Filus / Steffen mengel (champion)
6. (Singapore) Ethan Poh / Clarence Chew (quarter-finals)
7. (Chinese Taipei) Wang Tai-wei / Feng Yi-hsin (final)
8. (Japan) Kohei Sambe / Mizuki Oikawa (semi-finals)
9. (South Korea) Seo Hyun-deok / Baek Ho-gyun (quarter-finals)
10. (India) Arjun Ghosh / Raj Mondal (first round)
11. (Thailand) Yanapong Panagitgun / Pattaratorn Passara (preliminary round)
12. (India) Sudhanshu Grover / Birdie Boro (preliminary round)
13. (Singapore) Koen Pang / Josh Chua Shao Han (quarter-finals)
14. (Thailand) Komgrit Sangpao / Wattanachai Samranvong (preliminary round)
15. (Belgium) David Comeliau / Nicolas Degros (first round)
16. (Belgium) Louis Laffineur / Adrien Rassenfosse (first round)
17. (Singapore) Dominic Koh Song Jun / Beh Kun Ting (preliminary round)
18. (Chinese Taipei) Li Hsin-yu / Tai Ming-wei (first round)
19. (South Korea) Park Jeong-woo / Cheon Min-hyuck (first round)
20. (South Korea) Cho jae-jun / Jung Young-hun (quarter-finals)

=== Draw ===
First round
1	(Germany) T Hippler (Germany) K Ort	8	6	6
13	(Singapore) J Chua (Singapore) K Pang	11	11	11
10	(India) A Ghosh (India) R Mondal	6	3	8
7	(Chinese Taipei) Feng Y-h (Chinese Taipei) Wang T-w	11	11	11
8	(Japan) M Oikawa (Japan) K Sambe	11	11	11	11
18	(Chinese Taipei) Li H-y (Chinese Taipei) Tai M-w	7	7	13	5
20	(South Korea) Cho J-j (South Korea) Jung Younghun	11	14	11	10	11
4	(India) H Desai (India) A Yadav	6	16	7	12	3
3	(Thailand) P Tanviriyavechakul (Thailand) S Wisutmaythangkoon	8	12	11	3	11
16	(Belgium) L Laffineur (Belgium) A Rassenfosse	11	10	6	11	8
15	(Belgium) D Comeliau (Belgium) N Degros	6	6	4
6	(Singapore) C Chew (Singapore) E Poh	11	11	11
5	(Germany) R Filus (Germany) S Mengel	11	9	11	12
19	(South Korea) Cheon M-h (South Korea) Park J-w	5	11	9	10
9	(South Korea) Baek H-g (South Korea) Seo H-d	11	11	6	11
2	(Japan) K Matsudaira (Japan) J Ueda	9	8	11	9

Quarterfinals
13	(Singapore) J Chua (Singapore) K Pang	11	14	6	3	9
7	(Chinese Taipei) Feng Y-h (Chinese Taipei) Wang T-w	6	12	11	11	11
8	(Japan) M Oikawa (Japan) K Sambe	11	11	11
20	(South Korea) Cho J-j (South Korea) Jung Younghun	6	6	8
3	(Thailand) P Tanviriyavechakul (Thailand) S Wisutmaythangkoon	11	9	11	11
6	(Singapore) C Chew (Singapore) E Poh	9	11	3	9
5	(Germany) R Filus (Germany) S Mengel	10	11	11	11
9	(South Korea) Baek H-g (South Korea) Seo H-d	12	5	8	8

Semifinals
7	(Chinese Taipei) Feng Y-h (Chinese Taipei) Wang T-w	11	11	12	5	11
8	(Japan) M Oikawa (Japan) K Sambe	6	7	14	11	4
3	(Thailand) P Tanviriyavechakul (Thailand) S Wisutmaythangkoon	9	10	11	4
5	(Germany) R Filus (Germany) S Mengel	11	12	7	11

Final
7	(Chinese Taipei) Feng Y-h (Chinese Taipei) Wang T-w	7	11	10	11	5
5	(Germany) R Filus (Germany) S Mengel	11	8	12	7	11

== Women's doubles ==
=== Seeds ===
1. (Japan) Hitomi Sato (table tennis) / Honoka Hashimoto (semi-finals)
2. (Japan) Saki Shibata / Satsuki Odo (champion)
3. (Thailand) Orawan Paranang / Suthasini Sawettabut (semi-finals)
4. (Chinese Taipei) Huang Yu-wen / Li Yu-jhun (first round)
5. (India) Ayhika Mukherjee / Sutirtha Mukherjee (quarter-finals)
6. (Singapore) Goi Rui Xuan / Wong Xin Ru (first round)
7. (Thailand) Jinnipa Sawettabut / Nanthana Komwong (first round)
8. (Chinese Taipei) Huang Hsin / Huang Yu-chiao (first round)
9. (Singapore) Lim Euice / Tan En Hui (first round)
10. (South Korea) Kim Ming-yung / Lee Na-kyung (quarter-finals)
11. (South Korea) Sim Hyun-ju / Yoon Hyo-bin (first round)
12. (Malaysia) Alice Chang / Tee Ai Xin (quarter-finals)
13. (Malaysia) Ho Ying / Lyne Karen (preliminary round)
14. (South Korea) Kang Ga-yun / Kang Da-yeon (first round)
15. (Japan) Ayane Morita / Yuka Umemura (final)
16. (Hong Kong) Chau Wing Sze / Lee Ka Yee (quarter-finals)
17. (United States) Joanna Sung / Rachel Sung (preliminary round)
18. (Singapore) Pearlyn Koh / Jassy Tan (preliminary round)
19. (Thailand) Pakawan Karnthang / Papatchaya Hoarakkit (preliminary round)
20. (Hong Kong) Karen Lee / Wong Chin Yau (first round)

=== Draw ===
First round
1	(Japan) H Hashimoto (Japan) H Sato	11	11	11
9	(Singapore) Lim E (Singapore) Tan E H	8	7	4
16	(Hong Kong) Chau W S (Hong Kong) Lee K Y	11	11	11
6	(Singapore) Goi R X (Singapore) Wong X R	7	7	3
5	(India) A Mukherjee (India) S Mukherjee	12	11	11
20	(Hong Kong) K Lee (Hong Kong) Wong C Y	10	7	6
15	(Japan) A Morita (Japan) Y Umemura	15	11	4	12
4	(Chinese Taipei) Huang Y-w (Chinese Taipei) Li Y-j	13	5	11	10
3	(Thailand) O Paranang (Thailand) S Sawettabut	11	11	11
11	(South Korea) Sim H-j (South Korea) Yoon H-b	9	9	4
12	(Malaysia) A Chang (Malaysia) Tee A X	15	11	12
8	(Chinese Taipei) Huang H (Chinese Taipei) Huang Y-c	13	7	10
7	(Thailand) N Komwong (Thailand) J Sawettabut	9	8	8
10	(South Korea) Kim M-y (South Korea) Lee N-k	11	11	11
14	(South Korea) Kang D-y (South Korea) Kang G-y	4	9	11	11	15
2	(Japan) S Odo (Japan) S Shibata	11	11	6	8	17

Quarterfinals
1	(Japan) H Hashimoto (Japan) H Sato	11	11	11
16	(Hong Kong) Chau W S (Hong Kong) Lee K Y	6	6	5
5	(India) A Mukherjee (India) S Mukherjee	9	11	8	11	5
15	(Japan) A Morita (Japan) Y Umemura	11	9	11	7	11
3	(Thailand) O Paranang (Thailand) S Sawettabut	11	11	11
12	(Malaysia) A Chang (Malaysia) Tee A X	4	7	3
10	(South Korea) Kim M-y (South Korea) Lee N-k	3	11	7	6
2	(Japan) S Odo (Japan) S Shibata	11	7	11	11

Semifinals
1	(Japan) H Hashimoto (Japan) H Sato	11	11	2	10
15	(Japan) A Morita (Japan) Y Umemura	13	5	11	12
3	(Thailand) O Paranang (Thailand) S Sawettabut	11	6	9	13
2	(Japan) S Odo (Japan) S Shibata	5	11	11	15

Final
15	(Japan) A Morita (Japan) Y Umemura	6	10	14
2	(Japan) S Odo (Japan) S Shibata	11	12	16
