= 2019 Thailand Open =

2019 Thailand Open may refer to:

- 2019 Thailand Open (badminton)
- 2019 Thailand Open (table tennis)
- 2019 Thailand Open (tennis)
