= 2019 Pyongyang Open (table tennis) =

Tournament details
- Dates: 26–28 July 2019
- Competitors: 16S / 7MD / 6WD / 5XD
- Total prize money: US$60,000
- Location: Pyongyang, North Korea

Champions
- Men's singles: (North Korea) An Ji-song
- Women's singles: (North Korea) Kim Song-i
- Men's doubles: (North Korea) Ham Yu-song (North Korea) Ri Kwang-myong
- Women's doubles: (North Korea) Cha Hyo-sim (North Korea) Kim Nam-hae
- Mixed doubles: (North Korea) Ham Yu-song (North Korea) Cha Hyo-sim

The 2019 Pyongyang Open is the eighth event of the 2019 ITTF Challenge Series. It takes place from 26 to 28 July in Pyongyang, North Korea.

== Men's singles ==
=== Seeds ===
1. (Thailand) Supanut Wisutmaythangkoon (first round)
2. (North Korea) An Ji-song (champion)
3. (Scotland) Gavin Rumgay (quarter-finals)
4. (North Korea) Ham Yu-song (semi-finals)
5. (India) Mudit Dani (first round)
6. (Iran) Amin Ahmadian (quarter-finals)
7. (Chinese Taipei) Feng Yi-hsin (first round)
8. (Iran) Amir Hossein Hodaei (semi-finals)

=== Draw ===
First round
1 | (Thailand) S Wisutmaythangkoon | 11 | 11 | 11 | 9 | 9 | 7 | 4
(North Korea) Kim S-i | 5 | 7 | 9 | 11 | 11 | 11 | 11
(Chinese Taipei) Huang Y-c | 8 | 11 | 12 | 11 | 8 | 8
6 | (Iran) A Ahmadian | 11 | 2 | 14 | 8 | 11 | 11
7 | (Chinese Taipei) Feng Y-h | 11 | 6 | 4 | 9 | 11 | 8
(North Korea) Ri J-s | 7 | 11 | 11 | 11 | 9 | 11
(North Korea) Ro H-s | 7 | 12 | 11 | 4 | 7 | 12 | 10
4 | (North Korea) Ham Y-s | 11 | 10 | 6 | 11 | 11 | 10 | 12
3 | (Scotland) G Rumgay | 12 | 4 | 11 | 7 | 10 | 11 | 11
(North Korea) Chae M-u | 10 | 11 | 7 | 11 | 12 | 7 | 5
(North Korea) Ji Y-y | 11 | 15 | 12 | 8 | 11 | 11 | 6
8 | (Iran) A H Hodaei | 9 | 17 | 14 | 11 | 3 | 3 | 11
5 | (India) M Dani | 5 | 9 | 5 | 4
(North Korea) Kim O-c | 11 | 11 | 11 | 11
(North Korea) U T-r | 5 | 16 | 11 | 11 | 8 | 7 | 9
2 | (North Korea) An J-s | 11 | 14 | 8 | 6 | 11 | 11 | 11

Quarterfinals
(North Korea) Kim S-i | 11 | 11 | 11 | 11
6 | (Iran) A Ahmadian | 8 | 7 | 7 | 8
(North Korea) Ri J-s | 11 | 9 | 13 | 7 | 8 | 10
4 | (North Korea) Ham Y-s | 9 | 11 | 11 | 11 | 11 | 12
3 | (Scotland) G Rumgay | 5 | 9 | 11 | 10 | 10
8 | (Iran) A H Hodaei | 11 | 11 | 5 | 12 | 12
(North Korea) Kim O-c | 8 | 7 | 13 | 11 | 16 | 12
2 | (North Korea) An J-s | 11 | 11 | 15 | 7 | 14 | 14

Semifinals
(North Korea) Kim Song-il | 4 | 8 | 11 | 11 | 6 | 11 | 13
4 | (North Korea) Ham Yu-song | 11 | 11 | 3 | 9 | 11 | 3 | 11
8 | (Iran) Amir Hossein Hodaei | 5 | 11 | 5 | 5 | 10
2 | (North Korea) An Ji-song | 11 | 8 | 11 | 11 | 12

final
(North Korea) Kim Song-il | 9 | 11 | 4 | 12 | 10 | 4
2 | (North Korea) An Ji-song | 11 | 9 | 11 | 10 | 12 | 11

== Women's singles ==
=== Seeds ===
1. (North Korea) Kim Song-i (champion)
2. (North Korea) Cha Hyo-sim (quarter-finals)
3. (North Korea) Kim Nam-hae (semi-finals)
4. (Norway) Ilka Dovil (first round)
5. (North Korea) Kim Sol-song (quarter-finals)
6. (North Korea) Pyon Song-gyong (final)
7. (North Korea) Kim Jin-hyang (semi-finals)
8. (North Korea) Cha Su-yong (first round)

=== Draw ===
First round
1 | (North Korea) Kim S-i | 11 | 11 | 11 | 11
(North Korea) Jon K-m | 7 | 9 | 8 | 4
(North Korea) Ri H | 9 | 11 | 8 | 3 | 8
5 | (North Korea) Kim S-s | 11 | 3 | 11 | 11 | 11
7 | (North Korea) Kim J-h | 11 | 10 | 11 | 11 | 12
(North Korea) Kim K-y | 7 | 12 | 8 | 4 | 10
(North Korea) Kim J | 11 | 11 | 12 | 11
4 | (Norway) I Doval | 6 | 3 | 10 | 7
3 | (North Korea) Kim N-h | 11 | 10 | 11 | 7 | 13 | 11
(China) Gu RC | 6 | 12 | 9 | 11 | 11 | 6
(North Korea) Ri H-s | 11 | 11 | 11 | 11 | 11
8 | (North Korea) Cha S-y | 5 | 7 | 8 | 13 | 4
6 | (North Korea) Pyon S-g | 11 | 11 | 10 | 11 | 11
(North Korea) Choe H-h | 7 | 8 | 12 | 8 | 9
(North Korea) Ju H-h | 5 | 9 | 7 | 6
2 | (North Korea) Cha H-s | 11 | 11 | 11 | 11

Quarterfinals
1 | (North Korea) Kim S-i | 11 | 11 | 11 | 11
5 | (North Korea) Kim S-s | 8 | 8 | 8 | 7
7 | (North Korea) Kim J-h | 15 | 11 | 11 | 6 | 11 | 11
(North Korea) Kim J | 17 | 2 | 9 | 11 | 7 | 8
3 | (North Korea) Kim N-h | 5 | 12 | 11 | 13 | 8 | 11
(North Korea) Ri H-s | 11 | 10 | 8 | 11 | 11 | 8
6 | (North Korea) Pyon S-g | 11 | 4 | 11 | 11 | 13 | 15
2 | (North Korea) Cha H-s | 6 | 11 | 8 | 4 | 15 | 13

Semifinals
1 | (North Korea) Kim Song-i | 11 | 10 | 11 | 8 | 11 | 12
7 | (North Korea) Kim Jin-hyang | 5 | 12 | 3 | 11 | 2 | 10
3 | (North Korea) Kim Nam-hae | 18 | 5 | 8 | 11 | 5
6 | (North Korea) Pyon Song-gyong | 20 | 11 | 11 | 8 | 11

final
1 | (North Korea) Kim Song-i | 14 | 13 | 9 | 11 | 11
6 | (North Korea) Pyon Song-gyong | 12 | 11 | 11 | 5 | 9

== Men's doubles ==
=== Seeds ===
1. (Chinese Taipei) Tai Ming-wei / Feng Yi-hsin (semi-finals)
2. (North Korea) Ri Kwang-myong / Ham Yu-song (champion)
3. (Iran) Amir Hossein Hodaei / Amin Ahmadian (quarter-finals)
4. (North Korea) An Ji-song / Ro Hyon-song (final)
5. (Scotland) Gavin Rumgay / (India) Mudit Dani (quarter-finals)

=== Draw ===
Quarterfinals
(Chinese Taipei) Huang Yan-cheng (Chinese Taipei) Huang Yu-jen | 4 | 11 | 11 | 3 | 8
4 | (North Korea) An Ji-song (North Korea) Ro Hyon-song | 11 | 8 | 9 | 11 | 11
3 | (Iran) Amin Ahmadian (Iran) Amir Hossein Hodaei | 3 | 8 | 12 | 8
(North Korea) Kim Ok-chan (North Korea) Ri Jong-sik | 11 | 11 | 10 | 11
5 | (India) Mudit Dani (Scotland) Gavin Rumgay | 6 | 7 | 11 | 7
2 | (North Korea) Ham Yu-song (North Korea) Ri Kwang-myong | 11 | 11 | 7 | 11

Semifinals
1 | (Chinese Taipei) Feng Yi-hsin (Chinese Taipei) Tai Ming-wei | 6 | 8 | 11 | 8
4 | (North Korea) An Ji-song (North Korea) Ro Hyon-song | 11 | 11 | 7 | 11
(North Korea) Kim Ok-chan (North Korea) Ri Jong-sik | 9 | 5 | 7
2 | (North Korea) Ham Yu-song (North Korea) Ri Kwang-myong | 11 | 11 | 11

Final
4 | (North Korea) An Ji-song (North Korea) Ro Hyo-song | 15 | 5 | 12 | 11 | 7
2 | (North Korea) Ham Yu-song (North Korea) Ri Kwang-myong | 17 | 11 | 10 | 7 | 11

== Women's doubles ==
=== Seeds ===
1. (North Korea) Cha Hyo-sim / Kim Nam-hae (champion)
2. (Norway) Ilka Doval / (North Korea) Ri Hyon-sim (final)
3. (North Korea) Kim Jin-hyang / Pyon Song-gyong (semi-finals)

=== Draw ===
| Quarterfinals | | | | | | | Semifinals | | | | | | | Final |
| | | | | | | | 1 | (North Korea) Cha Hyo-sim (North Korea) Kim Nam-hae | 11 | 12 | 2 | 11 |
| | (Chinese Taipei) Chien Tung-chuan (Chinese Taipei) Yu Hsiu-ting | 5 | 4 | 11 | 4 | | 3 | (North Korea) Kim Jim-hyang (North Korea) Pyon Song-gyong | 8 | 10 | 11 | 7 |
| 3 | (North Korea) Kim Jin-hyang (North Korea) Pyon Song-gyong | 11 | 11 | 8 | 11 | | | | | | | | | 1 | (North Korea) Cha Hyo-sim (North Korea) Kim Nam-hae | 11 | 11 | 11 |
| | (North Korea) Ko Su-yong (North Korea) Ryu Il-gyong | 11 | 9 | 7 | 11 | 13 | | | | | | | | 2 | (Norway) Ilka Doval (North Korea) Ri Hyon-sim | 9 | 7 | 9 |
| | (Chinese Taipei) Cai Fong-en (Chinese Taipei) Chu Yi-ching | 6 | 11 | 11 | 2 | 11 | | (North Korea) Ko Su-yong (North Korea) Ryu Il-gyong | 11 | 10 | 11 | 5 | 3 |
| | | | | | | | 2 | (Norway) Ilka Doval (North Korea) Ri Hyon-sim | 9 | 12 | 8 | 11 | 11 |

== Mixed doubles ==
=== Seeds ===
1. (North Korea) Ham Yu-song / Cha Hyo-sim (champion)
2. (North Korea) Kim Nam-hae / An Ji-song (final)

=== Draw ===
| Quarterfinals | | Semifinals | | | | | | Final |
| | | 1 | (North Korea) Ham Yu-song (North Korea) Cha Hyo-sim | 11 | 11 | 11 |
| | | | (Chinese Taipei) Tai Ming-wei (Chinese Taipei) Yu Hsiu-ting | 8 | 3 | 7 |
| | | | | | | | | 1 | (North Korea) Ham Yu-song (North Korea) Cha Hyo-sim | 12 | 10 | 11 | 7 | 13 |
| (Chinese Taipei) Feng Yi-hsin (Chinese Taipei) Cai Fong-en | w/o | | | | | | | 2 | (North Korea) An Ji-song (North Korea) Kim Nam-hae | 10 | 12 | 6 | 11 | 11 |
| (China) Cui Qinglei (China) Gu Ruochen | | | (Chinese Taipei) Feng Yi-hsin (Chinese Taipei) Cai Fong-en | 14 | 7 | 6 | 2 |
| | | 2 | (North Korea) An Ji-song (North Korea) Kim Nam-hae | 12 | 11 | 11 | 11 |
