= Lee Na-kyung =

South Korean rhythmic gymnast (born 1998)

- 이나경
- Born: 8 May 1998 (age 28) Seoul, South Korea

Gymnastics career
- Discipline: Rhythmic gymnastics
- Country represented: South Korea (2014–2016)
- Retired: yes
Medal record
Representing South Korea
Asian Games
Silver medal – second place	2014 Incheon	Team

Lee Na-kyung (Korean: 이나경; born 8 May 1998) is a South Korean retired rhythmic gymnast. She represented her country in international competitions.

== Career ==
In September 2014 Lee won team silver with Gim Yun-hee, Lee Da-ae and Son Yeon-jae at the 2014 Asian Games in Incheon.

In 2015 she performed with hoop and ball at the Asian Championships, being 20th in the All-Around, 31st with hoop and 13th with ball. A week later she competed in the World Cup in Tashkent, finishing 21st in the All-Around, 19th with hoop, 22nd with ball, 17th with clubs and 21st with ribbon.
