= Anastassiya Lavrova =

Kazakhstani table tennis player

Personal information
- Nationality: Kazakhstan
- Born: 26 July 1995 (age 30)

Sport
- Sport: Table tennis

Anastassiya Lavrova (born 26 July 1995) is a Kazakhstani table tennis player. She competed in the 2020 Summer Olympics.
