= Pauline Chasselin =

French table tennis player

Personal information
- Nationality: French
- Born: 1 August 1997 (age 28)

Sport
- Sport: Table tennis

Pauline Chasselin (born 1 August 1997) is a French table tennis player. Her highest career ITTF ranking was 106.
