= Mariia Tailakova =

Russian table tennis player (born 2001)

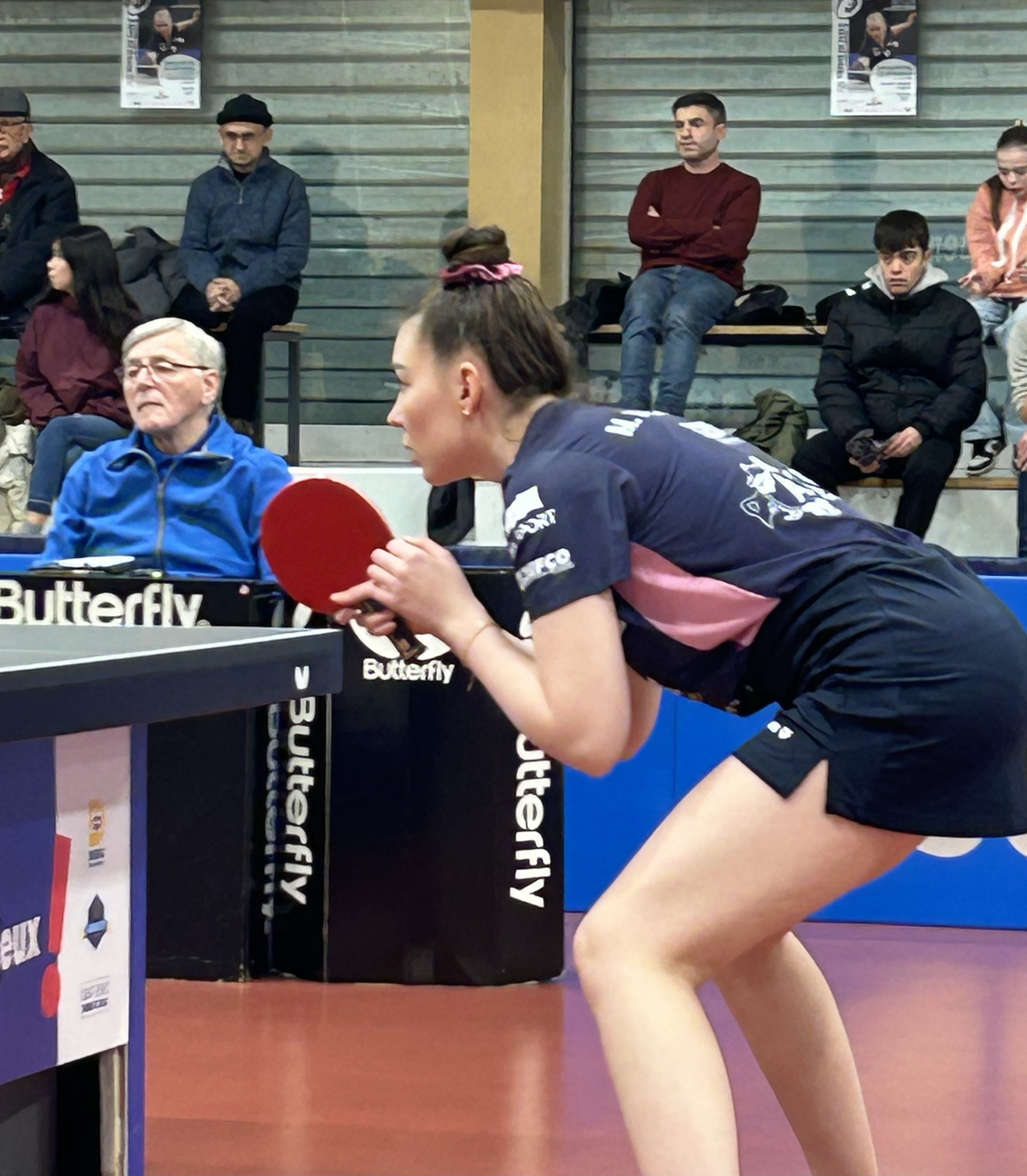

Personal information
- Native name: Мария Владимировна Тайлакова
- Nationality: Russian
- Born: 12 March 2001 (age 25) Kirovo-Chepetsk, Russia

Sport
- Sport: Table tennis

Mariia Tailakova (born 12 March 2001) is a Russian table tennis player. Her highest career ITTF ranking was 84.
