= Enzo Angles =

French table tennis player

Personal information
- Nationality: French
- Born: 2 May 1995 (age 31) France

Sport
- Sport: Table tennis
- Club: Carolina Gold Rush (MLTT)
- Playing style: left-handed, two-winged attacker
- Equipment: GEWO Sensus Carbo (blade); GEWO Codexx Superselect Pro 55 (rubber)

Enzo Angles (born 2 May 1995) is a French professional table tennis player. Angles has been both a European Junior Champion & plays for Carolina Gold Rush (Major League Table Tennis - MLTT), the first team to compete in the US for the new pro table tennis league. Angles was also the first MVP (Most Valuable Player) for the inaugural season of the MLTT in 2024.

== Career ==
=== Junior and European achievements ===
Angles established himself within the French table tennis circuit through his performance in continental competitions. At the 2013 European Junior Championships in Ostrava, Angles secured the gold medal in Boys' Singles by defeating Tomislav Pucar.

=== Professional highlights ===
In 2021, he won the Men's Singles title at the Finlandia Open. During the final against Joao Geraldo, the match reached a seventh game where Angles won the deciding game after trailing and neutralizing nine consecutive match points.

=== Major League Table Tennis (MLTT) ===
Angles moved to the United States to compete in the inaugural season of Major League Table Tennis, playing for the Carolina Gold Rush. In 2024, he was elected the league's first Most Valuable Player (MVP). Following the 2024 MLTT draft, Angles led the Gold Rush to the league championship title in 2025. He maintains an active USATT rating of over 2700 as part of his professional play in the American circuit.

== Playing style and equipment ==
Angles plays an attacking style built around loops and forehand finishing. His performance at the 2021 Finnish Open drew attention to his ability to compete under pressure.

Angles uses GEWO Sensus Carbo (blade) and GEWO Codexx Superselect Pro 55 (rubber) on forehand and backhand.
