= Debora Vivarelli =

Italian table tennis player (born 1993)

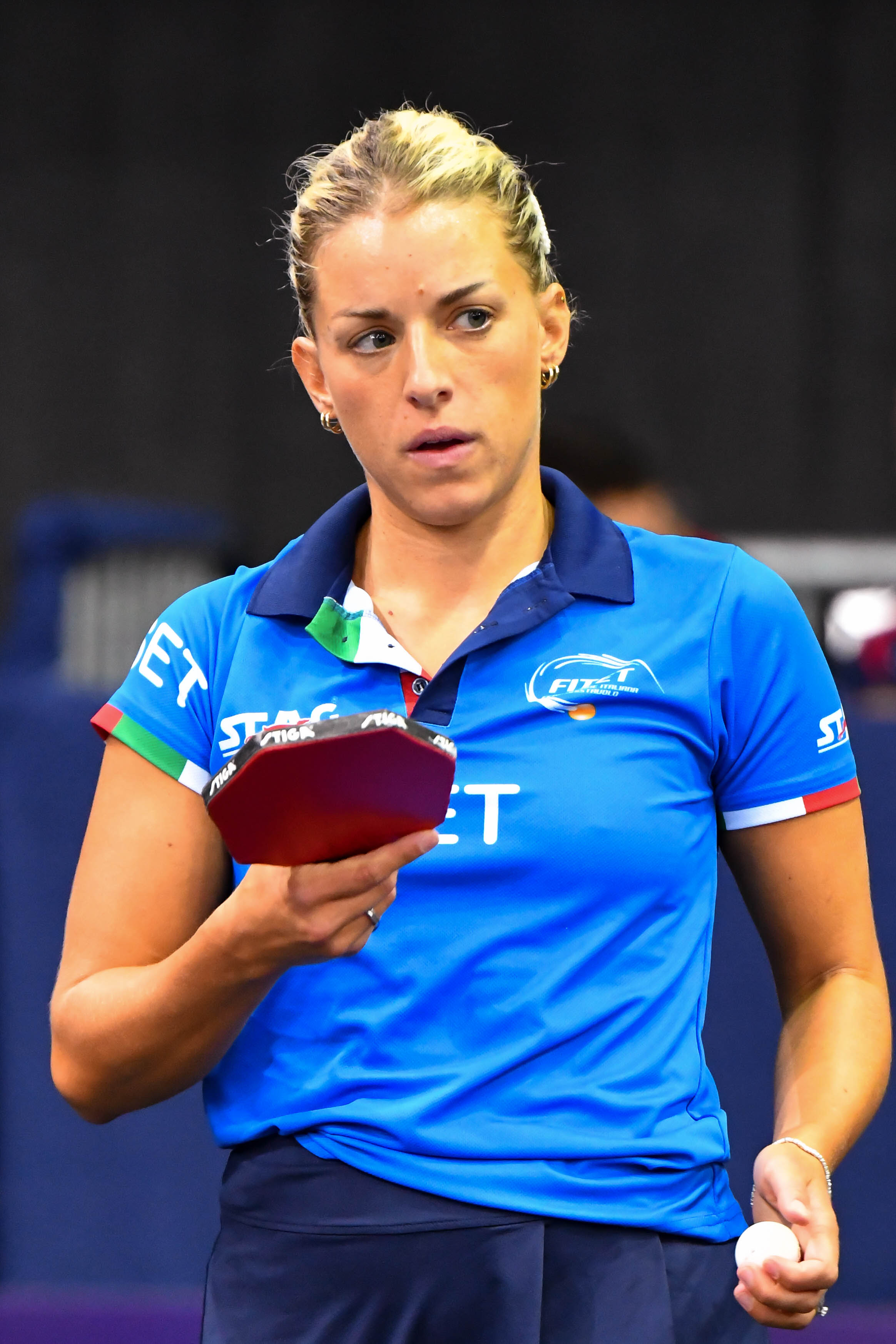

Personal information
- Nationality: Italy
- Born: 28 January 1993 (age 33) Bolzano, Italy
- Height: 165 cm (5 ft 5 in)
- Weight: 63 kg (139 lb)

Sport
- Sport: Table tennis

Debora Vivarelli (born 28 January 1993 Bolzano) is an Italian table tennis player. She competed in the women's single tournament at the 2020 Summer Olympics.

She competed at the Italian Youth Championships She plays for Appiano.
