= Mak Tze Wing =

Hong Kong table tennis player

Personal information
- Nationality: Hong Konger
- Born: 31 July 1998 (age 27)
Medal record
Women's table tennis
Representing Hong Kong
World Championships
Bronze medal – third place	2018 Halmstad	Team
World Cup
Bronze medal – third place	2018 London	Team
Asian Championships
Bronze medal – third place	2017 Wuxi	Team]]

Mak Tze Wing (Chinese: 麥子詠; born 31 July 1998) is a Hong Konger table tennis player. Her highest career ITTF ranking was 86 in April 2017.
