= Ruwen Filus =

German table tennis player

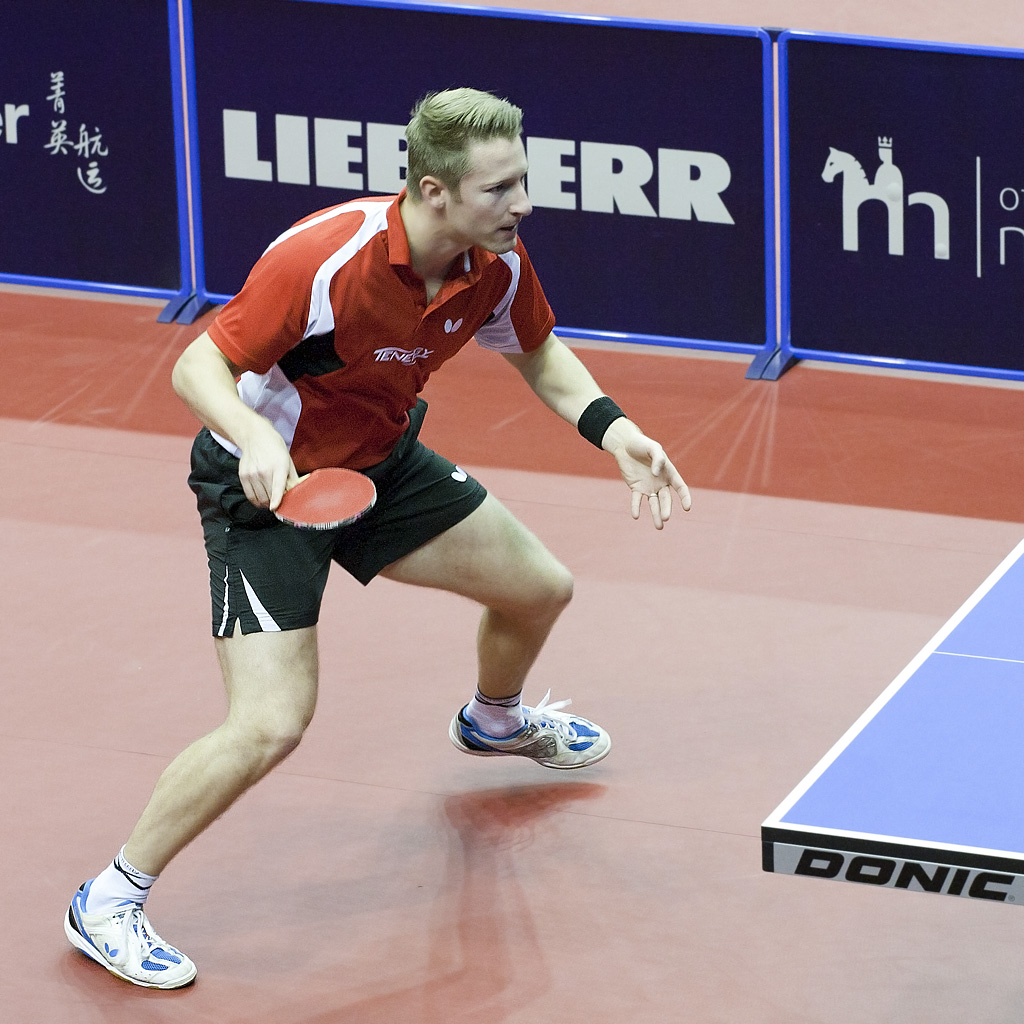
- Filus in 2017

Personal information
- Nationality: German
- Born: 14 February 1988 (age 38) Bückeburg, Germany
- Height: 185 cm (6 ft 1 in)
- Weight: 80 kg (176 lb)

Sport
- Sport: Table tennis
- Club: TTC RhönSprudel Fulda-Maberzell
- Playing style: Right-handed, shakehand grip
- Highest ranking: 18 (January 2018)
- Current ranking: 697 (5 October 2026)
Medal record
Men's table tennis
Representing Germany
World Championships
Silver medal – second place	2018 Halmstad	Team
World Cup
Bronze medal – third place	2011 Magdeburg	Team
European Championships
Gold medal – first place	2011 Gdańsk–Sopot	Team
Gold medal – first place	2017 Luxembourg City	Team
Gold medal – first place	2018 Alicante	Mixed doubles
Gold medal – first place	2021 Cluj-Napoca	Team
Silver medal – second place	2015 Yekaterinburg	Team
Bronze medal – third place	2018 Alicante	Doubles

Ruwen Filus is a German table tennis player who plays for German club TTC RhönSprudel Fulda-Maberzell in the German Tischtennis-Bundesliga.

== Career ==
=== 2021 ===
In March, Filus played in WTT Doha. In the WTT Star Contender event, he upset Jang Woojin in the round of 32, Jun Mizutani in the round of 16, Lin Yun-Ju in the quarter-finals, and Darko Jorgić in the semi-finals en route to an impressive surprise run to the finals. He lost to Tomokazu Harimoto 4-2 in the finals.

=== Singles titles ===
Year	Tournament	Final opponent	Score	Ref
2019	ITTF Challenge, Thailand Open	(South Korea) Seo Hyun-deok	4–2	
2022	WTT Contender Almaty	(Chinese Taipei) Lin Yun-ju	4–3	

== Material and playing style ==
Filus is an allroundplayer who uses a Joo Se Huyk blade with long pips (butterfly feint long 1,5mm) on the backhand and a fast and spinny rubber (Butterfly Bryce) on the forehand. He can play defensive backspin but also topspin attack on both sides and uses this styles tactical according to the match situation and makes a lot of points with offensive attacks.
