= Minnie Soo =

Hong Kong table tennis player

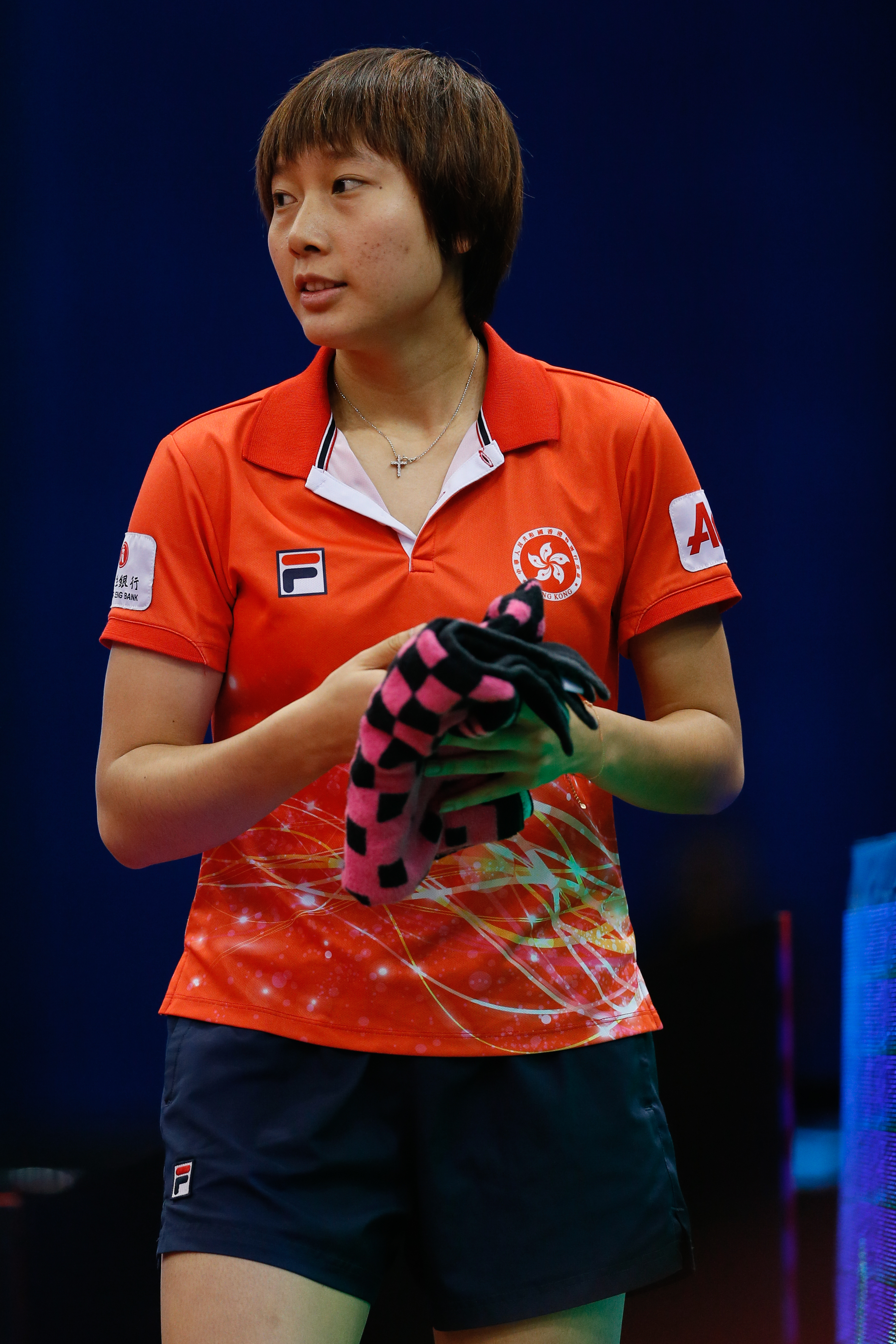
- Soo at the 2017 Asian Table Tennis Championships

Personal information
- Full name: Minnie Soo Wai Yam
- Nationality: Hong Kong
- Born: 13 April 1998 (age 28) Hong Kong
- Height: 169 cm (5 ft 7 in)

Sport
- Sport: Table tennis
- Club: Nippon Paint Mallets
- Playing style: Right-handed shakehand grip
- Highest ranking: 25 (February 2018)
- Current ranking: 161 (June 2022)
Medal record
Women's table tennis
Representing Hong Kong
Olympic Games
Bronze medal – third place	2020 Tokyo	Team
World Championships
Bronze medal – third place	2018 Halmstad	Team
Asian Games
Bronze medal – third place	2018 Jakarta	Team
World University Games
Bronze medal – third place	2021 Chengdu	Team

Minnie Soo
- Traditional Chinese: 蘇慧音
- Simplified Chinese: 苏慧音
- Jyutping: Sou^{1} Wai^{6} Jam^{1}
Transcriptions
Standard Mandarin
- Hanyu Pinyin: Sū Huìyīn
Yue: Cantonese
- Jyutping: Sou^{1} Wai^{6} Jam^{1}

Minnie Soo Wai Yam MH (Chinese: 蘇慧音, born 13 April 1998) is a Hong Kong table tennis player. In 2018, she won bronze in the women’s team event at the World Championship and the Asian Games. Later at the 2020 Summer Olympics, she also won a bronze medal in the women’s team event with Doo Hoi Kem and Lee Ho Ching.

== Early life and education ==
Soo is the daughter of former Hong Kong table tennis player Soo Chun-wah. She was exposed to the sport at age 3½ and began receiving formal training at 5 years old. At 10 years old, she joined Hong Kong's youth table tennis team. She was a student of Diocesan Girls' School but dropped out in secondary three to become a full-time athlete.

In September 2022, she started studying at the Hong Kong University of Science and Technology, majoring physics.

== Career ==
=== 2021 ===
At the 2020 Summer Olympics, Soo, as well as her teammates Doo Hoi Kem and Lee Ho Ching, qualified for the women’s team event. They won bronze after defeating the German team with 3-1, earning Hong Kong’s first medal in the Olympics team event and second medal in table tennis.

== See also ==
- Hong Kong at the 2020 Summer Olympics
