= Maki Shiomi =

Japanese table tennis player

Personal information
- Born: 12 May 2000 (age 26) Matsuyama, Ehime, Japan
- Height: 153 cm (5 ft 0 in)

Sport
- Sport: Table tennis
- Playing style: Right-handed shakehand grip
- Highest ranking: 32 (March 2018)
- Current ranking: 90 (March 2020)

Maki Shiomi (塩見 真希, Shiomi Maki; born 12 May 2000) is a Japanese table tennis player.

== Achievements ==
=== ITTF Tours ===
Women's singles

Year	Tournament	Level	Final opponent	Score	Rank
2016	Czech Open	World Tour	Yang Xiaoxin	0–4	2nd place, silver medalist(s)

Women's doubles

Year	Tournament	Level	Partner	Final opponents	Score	Rank
2019	Paraguay Open	Challenge	Honoka Hashimoto	Adriana Díaz; Melanie Díaz	3–1	1st place, gold medalist(s)
2019	Polish Open	Challenge	Honoka Hashimoto	Lee Eun-hye; Shin Yu-bin	3–1	1st place, gold medalist(s)
2020	Spanish Open	Challenge	Honoka Hashimoto	Satsuki Odo; Saki Shibata	0–3	2nd place, silver medalist(s)
