= List of South East Asian Junior and Cadet Table Tennis Championships medalists =

== Winners of South East Asian Junior and Cadet Table Tennis Championships ==
=== Juniors (U-18) ===
Year	Singles		Doubles			Team	
Year	Boys'	Girls'	Boys'	Girls'	Mixed	Boys'	Girls'
1993; Kuala Lumpur							
1994							
1995							
1996; Kuala Lumpur							
1998							
2000							
2001; Ipoh							
2002; Singapore							
2003							
2004							
2005; Bandar Seri Begawan							
2006; Bangkok							
2007; Laos							
2008; Kuala Lumpur							
2009; Bangkok							
2010; Phnom Penh	(Singapore) Pang Xue Jie	(Singapore) Li Siyun Isabelle	(Singapore) Pang Xue Jie (Singapore) Lim Jie Yan	(Thailand) Suthasini Sawettabut (Thailand) Areeya Sangpao	(Singapore) Clarence Chew (Singapore) Li Siyun Isabelle	Vietnam	Singapore
2011; Hai Duong			(Singapore) Clarence Chew (Singapore)		(Singapore) Clarence Chew (Singapore)	Singapore	
2012; Yogyakarta	(Thailand) Padasak Tanviriyavechakul	(Singapore) Li Siyun Isabelle		(Singapore) Li Siyun Isabelle (Singapore) Tang Jiawen Cheryl	(Thailand) Padasak Tanviriyavechakul (Thailand) Rattanavongsa Rattanaporn	Thailand	Singapore
2013; Manila	(Singapore) Clarence Chew	(Singapore) Lin Ye	(Singapore) Clarence Chew (Singapore) Kerry Tan	(Singapore) Lin Ye (Singapore) Yee Herng Hwee	(Singapore) Clarence Chew (Singapore) Lin Ye	Thailand	Singapore
2014; Bandar Seri Begawan	(Thailand) Nitipat Pimrat	(Singapore) Lin Ye	(Malaysia) Mohamad Hashri Fikri (Malaysia) Wong Chun Cheun	(Thailand) Apichaya Sritavarit (Thailand) Orawan Paranang	(Thailand) Supanat Wisutmaythangkoon (Thailand) Orawan Paranang	Thailand	Singapore
2015; Kuala Lumpur	(Thailand) Sirawit Puangthip	(Thailand) Tamolwan Khetkhuan	(Thailand) Sirawit Puangthip (Thailand) Pattaratorn Passara	(Thailand) Tamolwan Khetkhuan (Thailand) Orawan Paranang	(Thailand) Pattaratorn Passara (Thailand) Tamolwan Khetkhuan	Thailand	Thailand
2016; Phnom Penh	(Singapore) Ethan Poh Shao Feng	(Thailand) Monapsorn Saritapirak	(Singapore) Lucas Tan (Singapore) Maxxe Tay	(Singapore) Zhang Wanling (Singapore) Tan En Hui	(Singapore) Maxxe Tay (Singapore) Tan En Hui	Singapore	Singapore
2017; Singapore	(Singapore) Ethan Poh Shao Feng	(Singapore) Nicole Lew Zermaine	(Thailand) Yanapong Panagitgun (Thailand) Pattaratorn Passara	(Singapore) Tan En Hui (Singapore) Zhang Wanling	(Singapore) Ethan Poh Shao Feng (Singapore) Wong Xinru	Thailand	Singapore
2018; Naga	(Singapore) Pang Yew En Koen	(Singapore) Wong Xinru	(Singapore) Pang Yew En Koen (Singapore) Koh Song Jun Dominic	(Singapore) Wong Xinru (Singapore) Goi Rui Xuan	(Singapore) Pang Yew En Koen (Singapore) Goi Rui Xuan	Singapore	Singapore
2019; Bangkok	(Thailand) Wattanachai Samranvong	(Malaysia) Karen Lyne Anak Dick	(Singapore) Pang Yew En Koen (Singapore) Chua Shao Han Josh	(Malaysia) Karen Lyne Anak Dick (Malaysia) Tee Ai Xin	(Singapore) Pang Yew En Koen (Singapore) Goi Rui Xuan	Singapore	Singapore

=== Cadets (U-15) ===
Year	Singles		Doubles		Team	
Year	Boys'	Girls'	Boys'	Girls'	Boys'	Girls'
1993; Kuala Lumpur						
1994						
1995						
1996; Kuala Lumpur						
1998						
2000						
2001; Ipoh						
2002; Singapore						
2003						
2004						
2005; Bandar Seri Begawan						
2006; Bangkok						
2007; Laos						
2008; Kuala Lumpur						
2009; Bangkok						
2010; Phnom Penh	(Thailand) Padasak Tanviriyavechakul	(Vietnam) Nguyen Hong Tam	(Singapore) Chew Clarence (Singapore) Tan Kiat Yi Kerry	(Thailand) Tamolwan Khetkuen (Thailand) Piyaporn Pannak	None	None
2011; Hai Duong						
2012; Yogyakarta	(Singapore) Yin Jing Yuan	(Thailand) Tamolwan Khetkuen	(Malaysia) Leong Chee Feng (Malaysia) Clement Sim Kwong Zhi	(Singapore) Ang Wan Qi (Singapore) Yee Herng Hwee	None	None
2013; Manila	(Malaysia) Leong Chee Feng	(Singapore) Ang Wan Qi	(Thailand) Sirawit Puangthip (Thailand) Chaiyadej Moungwhan	(Malaysia) Angeline Tang (Malaysia) Amanda Wong	Thailand	Singapore
2014; Bandar Seri Begawan	(Singapore) Lucas Tan	(Thailand) Cathareeya Poungsri	(Thailand) Pattaratorn Passara (Thailand) Yanapong Panagitgun	(Thailand) Cathareeya Poungsri (Thailand) Monapsorn Saritapirak	Thailand	Indonesia
2015; Kuala Lumpur	(Thailand) Yannapong Panagitgun	(Singapore) Nicole Lew Zermaine	(Malaysia) Javen Choong (Malaysia) Chin Wen Jie	(Thailand) Jinnipa Sawettabut (Thailand) Monapsorn Saritapirak	Thailand	Thailand
2016; Phnom Penh	(Singapore) Beh Kun Ting	(Singapore) Goi Rui Xuan	(Singapore) Beh Kun Ting (Singapore) Pang Yew En Koen		Singapore	Singapore
2017; Singapore	(Singapore) Pang Yew En Koen	(Thailand) Nanapat Kola	(Singapore) Dominic Song Jun Koh (Singapore) Pang Yew En Koen	(Malaysia) Kuan E. Xian (Malaysia) Karen Lyne Anak Dick	Singapore	Malaysia
2018; Naga	(Singapore) Yan Kai Andy Wong	(Singapore) Zhou Jingyi	(Malaysia) Amos Ling Yi Heng (Malaysia) Wong Qi Shen	(Singapore) Zhou Jingyi (Singapore) Ser Lin Qian	Singapore	Singapore
2019; Bangkok	(Singapore) Izaac Quek Yong	(Singapore) Zhou Jingyi	(Singapore) Izaac Quek Yong (Singapore) Daniel Ng	(Thailand) Wanwisa Aueawiriyayothin (Thailand) Phantita Pinyopisan	Singapore	Singapore

== Results of SEATTA Junior and Cadet Championships Events ==
The tables below are South East Asian Junior and Cadet Table Tennis Champions lists of events (Boys' and Girls' Singles, Boys', Girls', and Mixed Doubles, and Boys' and Girls' Team).

=== Juniors (U-18) ===
==== Junior Boys' Singles ====
Year	Host City	Gold	Silver	Bronze
1993	Kuala Lumpur			
1994				
1995				
1996	Kuala Lumpur			
1998				
2000				
2001	Ipoh			
2002	Singapore			
2003				
2004				
2005	Bandar Seri Begawan			
2006	Bangkok			
2007	Laos			
2008	Kuala Lumpur			
2009	Bangkok			
2010	Phnom Penh	(Singapore) Pang Xue Jie	(Vietnam) Nguyen Huu Duc	(Thailand) Tanapol Santiwattanatarm
2010	Phnom Penh	(Singapore) Pang Xue Jie	(Vietnam) Nguyen Huu Duc	(Thailand) Montryphat Nithibenyaphisamai
2011	Hai Duong			(Singapore) Clarence Chew
2012	Yogyakarta	(Thailand) Padasak Tanviriyavechakul	(Thailand) Tanapol Santiwattanatarm	(Singapore) Clarence Chew
2012	Yogyakarta	(Thailand) Padasak Tanviriyavechakul	(Thailand) Tanapol Santiwattanatarm	(Malaysia) Haiqal Muhamad Ashraf
2013	Manila	(Singapore) Clarence Chew	(Thailand) Padasak Tanviriyavechakul	(Singapore) Yin Jing Yuan
2013	Manila	(Singapore) Clarence Chew	(Thailand) Padasak Tanviriyavechakul	Vietnam
2014	Bandar Seri Begawan	(Thailand) Nitipat Pimrat	(Thailand) Komgrit Sangpao	(Malaysia) Mohamad Hashri Fikri
2014	Bandar Seri Begawan	(Thailand) Nitipat Pimrat	(Thailand) Komgrit Sangpao	(Thailand) Supanat Wisutmaythangkoon
2015	Kuala Lumpur	(Thailand) Sirawit Puangthip	(Singapore) Yin Jing Yuan	(Singapore) Lim Zheng Jie Edric
2015	Kuala Lumpur	(Thailand) Sirawit Puangthip	(Singapore) Yin Jing Yuan	(Thailand) Naphat Panitcharoen
2016	Phnom Penh	(Singapore) Ethan Poh Shao Feng	(Singapore) Lucas Tan	(Vietnam) Vu Quang Hien
2017	Singapore	(Singapore) Ethan Poh Shao Feng	(Singapore) Lucas Tan	(Thailand) Pattaratorn Passara
2017	Singapore	(Singapore) Ethan Poh Shao Feng	(Singapore) Lucas Tan	(Vietnam) Nguyen Anh Duc
2018	Naga	(Singapore) Pang Yew En Koeng	(Singapore) Chua Shao Han Josh	(Singapore) Yu Zong Jun Gerald
2018	Naga	(Singapore) Pang Yew En Koeng	(Singapore) Chua Shao Han Josh	(Thailand) Yanapong Panagitgun
2019	Bangkok	(Thailand) Wattanachai Samranvong	(Singapore) Pang Yew En Koen	(Singapore) Koh Song Jun Dominic
2019	Bangkok	(Thailand) Wattanachai Samranvong	(Singapore) Pang Yew En Koen	(Thailand) Yanapong Panagitgun

==== Junior Girls' Singles ====
Year	Host City	Gold	Silver	Bronze
1993	Kuala Lumpur			
1994				
1995				
1996	Kuala Lumpur			
1998				
2000				
2001	Ipoh			
2002	Singapore			
2003				
2004				
2005	Bandar Seri Begawan			
2006	Bangkok			
2007	Laos			
2008	Kuala Lumpur			
2009	Bangkok			
2010	Phnom Penh	(Singapore) Li Siyun Isabelle	(Thailand) Suthasini Sawettabut	(Singapore) Kwa Hui Qi
2010	Phnom Penh	(Singapore) Li Siyun Isabelle	(Thailand) Suthasini Sawettabut	(Thailand) Pisittha Makumporn
2011	Hai Duong			
2012	Yogyakarta	(Singapore) Li Siyun Isabelle	(Vietnam)	(Thailand) Piyaporn Pannak
2012	Yogyakarta	(Singapore) Li Siyun Isabelle	(Vietnam)	(Vietnam)
2013	Manila	(Singapore) Lin Ye	(Thailand) Orawan Paranang	(Thailand) Piyaporn Pannak
2013	Manila	(Singapore) Lin Ye	(Thailand) Orawan Paranang	(Thailand) Thamonwan Khet Dam
2014	Bandar Seri Begawan	(Singapore) Lin Ye	(Thailand) Orawan Paranang	(Singapore) Yee Herng Hwee
2014	Bandar Seri Begawan	(Singapore) Lin Ye	(Thailand) Orawan Paranang	(Singapore) Ang Wan Qi
2015	Kuala Lumpur	(Thailand) Tamolwan Khetkhuan	(Thailand) Orawan Paranang	(Singapore) Yee Herng Hwee
2015	Kuala Lumpur	(Thailand) Tamolwan Khetkhuan	(Thailand) Orawan Paranang	(Singapore) Ang Wan Qi
2016	Phnom Penh	(Thailand) Monapsorn Saritapirak	(Singapore) Nicole Lew Zermaine	(Singapore) Ang Wan Qi
2017	Singapore	(Singapore) Nicole Lew Zermaine	(Singapore) Eunice Zoe Lim	(Malaysia) Alice Li Sian Chang
2017	Singapore	(Singapore) Nicole Lew Zermaine	(Singapore) Eunice Zoe Lim	(Thailand) Jinnipa Sawettabut
2018	Naga	(Singapore) Wong Xinru	(Malaysia) Karen Lyne Anak Dick	(Philippines) Jannah Maryam Romero
2018	Naga	(Singapore) Wong Xinru	(Malaysia) Karen Lyne Anak Dick	(Thailand) Nanapat Kola
2019	Bangkok	(Malaysia) Karen Lyne Anak Dick	(Singapore) Goi Rui Xuan	(Malaysia) Tee Ai Xin
2019	Bangkok	(Malaysia) Karen Lyne Anak Dick	(Singapore) Goi Rui Xuan	(Singapore) Wong Xin Ru

==== Junior Boys' Doubles ====
Year	Host City	Gold	Silver	Bronze
1993	Kuala Lumpur			
1994				
1995				
1996	Kuala Lumpur			
1998				
2000				
2001	Ipoh			
2002	Singapore			
2003				
2004				
2005	Bandar Seri Begawan			
2006	Bangkok			
2007	Laos			
2008	Kuala Lumpur			
2009	Bangkok			
2010	Phnom Penh	(Singapore) Pang Xue Jie (Singapore) Lim Jie Yan	(Indonesia) Julius Dwi Cahyo Kusumo (Indonesia) Rocky Christofel Eman	(Thailand) Peerapol Kunprasert (Thailand) Tanapol Santiwattanatarm
2010	Phnom Penh	(Singapore) Pang Xue Jie (Singapore) Lim Jie Yan	(Indonesia) Julius Dwi Cahyo Kusumo (Indonesia) Rocky Christofel Eman	(Vietnam) Nguyen Huu Duc (Vietnam) Ha Phuoc Thanh
2011	Hai Duong	(Singapore) Chew Clarence (Singapore)		
2012	Yogyakarta	(Thailand) Tanapol Santiwattanatarm (Thailand) Padasak Tanviriyavechakul	(Singapore) Chew Clarence (Singapore) Tan Kiat Yi Kerry	(Singapore) Tay Jit Kiat (Singapore) Teo Yi Sen Bryan
2012	Yogyakarta	(Thailand) Tanapol Santiwattanatarm (Thailand) Padasak Tanviriyavechakul	(Singapore) Chew Clarence (Singapore) Tan Kiat Yi Kerry	(Vietnam) (Vietnam)
2013	Manila	(Singapore) Clarence Chew (Singapore) Kerry Tan	(Vietnam) Tran Hoai Nam (Vietnam) Le Tuan Anh	(Thailand) Padasak Tanviriyavechakul (Thailand) Suphanat Wisutmethangkun
2013	Manila	(Singapore) Clarence Chew (Singapore) Kerry Tan	(Vietnam) Tran Hoai Nam (Vietnam) Le Tuan Anh	(Vietnam) (Vietnam)
2014	Bandar Seri Begawan	(Malaysia) Mohamad Hashri Fikri (Malaysia) Wong Chun Cheun	(Vietnam) Bui Trung Kien (Vietnam) Nguyen Duc Tuan	(Singapore) Edric Lim Zheng Jie (Singapore) Kyros Koh Yik Kiat
2014	Bandar Seri Begawan	(Malaysia) Mohamad Hashri Fikri (Malaysia) Wong Chun Cheun	(Vietnam) Bui Trung Kien (Vietnam) Nguyen Duc Tuan	(Thailand) Nitipat Pimrat (Thailand) Komgrit Sangpao
2015	Kuala Lumpur	(Thailand) Sirawit Puangthip (Thailand) Pattaratorn Passara	(Singapore) Yin Jing Yuan (Singapore) Ethan Poh Shao Feng	(Vietnam) Nguyen Duc Tuan (Vietnam) Le Van Duc
2015	Kuala Lumpur	(Thailand) Sirawit Puangthip (Thailand) Pattaratorn Passara	(Singapore) Yin Jing Yuan (Singapore) Ethan Poh Shao Feng	(Vietnam) Nguyen Van Huan (Vietnam) Dang Tran Son
2016	Phnom Penh	(Singapore) Lucas Tan (Singapore) Maxxe Tay	(Vietnam) (Vietnam)	(Singapore) Ethan Poh Shao Feng (Singapore) Darren Loy
2016	Phnom Penh	(Singapore) Lucas Tan (Singapore) Maxxe Tay	(Vietnam) (Vietnam)	(Singapore) Lucas Tan (Singapore) Ethan Poh Shao Feng
2017	Singapore	(Thailand) Yanapong Panagitgun (Thailand) Pattaratorn Passara	(Thailand) Purit Verakultawan (Singapore) Pankhoyoi Supakorn	(Malaysia) Javen Choong (Malaysia) Chin Wen Jie
2017	Singapore	(Thailand) Yanapong Panagitgun (Thailand) Pattaratorn Passara	(Thailand) Purit Verakultawan (Singapore) Pankhoyoi Supakorn	(Singapore) Lucas Tan (Singapore) Ethan Poh Shao Feng
2018	Naga	(Singapore) Pang Yew En Koen (Singapore) Koh Song Jun Dominic	(Thailand) Yanapong Panagitgun (Thailand) Supakron Pankhaoyoy	(Singapore) Gerald Yu (Singapore) Chua Shao Han Josh
2018	Naga	(Singapore) Pang Yew En Koen (Singapore) Koh Song Jun Dominic	(Thailand) Yanapong Panagitgun (Thailand) Supakron Pankhaoyoy	(Thailand) Tananan Tantakool (Thailand) Thyme Sanglertsilpachai
2019	Bangkok	(Singapore) Pang Yew En Koen (Singapore) Chua Shao Han Josh	(Thailand) Yanapong Panagitgun (Thailand) Veerapat Puthikungasem	(Malaysia) Ling Yi Heng Amos (Malaysia) Danny Ng Wann Sing
2019	Bangkok	(Singapore) Pang Yew En Koen (Singapore) Chua Shao Han Josh	(Thailand) Yanapong Panagitgun (Thailand) Veerapat Puthikungasem	(Singapore) Beh Kun Ting (Singapore) Koh Song Jun Dominic

==== Junior Girls' Doubles ====
Year	Host city	Gold	Silver	Bronze
1993	Kuala Lumpur			
1994				
1995				
1996	Kuala Lumpur			
1998				
2000				
2001	Ipoh			
2002	Singapore			
2003				
2004				
2005	Bandar Seri Begawan			
2006	Bangkok			
2007	Laos			
2008	Kuala Lumpur			
2009	Bangkok			
2010	Phnom Penh	(Thailand) Suthasini Sawettabut (Thailand) Areeya Sangpao	(Singapore) Look Pei Yee Sylvia (Singapore) Li Siyun Isablle	(Singapore) Chau Hai Qing (Singapore) Kwa Hui Qi
2010	Phnom Penh	(Thailand) Suthasini Sawettabut (Thailand) Areeya Sangpao	(Singapore) Look Pei Yee Sylvia (Singapore) Li Siyun Isablle	(Vietnam) Nguyen Thi Veit Linh (Vietnam) Tran Thi Cam Tien
2011	Hai Duong			
2012	Yogyakarta	(Singapore) Li Siyun Isabelle (Singapore) Tang Jiawen Cheryl	(Thailand) Rattanavongsa Rattanaporn (Thailand) Piyaporn Pannak	(Malaysia) Lee Rou You (Malaysia) Ho Ying
2012	Yogyakarta	(Singapore) Li Siyun Isabelle (Singapore) Tang Jiawen Cheryl	(Thailand) Rattanavongsa Rattanaporn (Thailand) Piyaporn Pannak	(Vietnam) (Vietnam)
2013	Manila	(Singapore) Lin Ye (Singapore) Yee Herng Hwee	(Malaysia) Ho Ying (Malaysia) Lee Rou You	(Singapore) Cheryl Tang (Singapore) Lim Yixuan
2013	Manila	(Singapore) Lin Ye (Singapore) Yee Herng Hwee	(Malaysia) Ho Ying (Malaysia) Lee Rou You	(Thailand) Tamolwan Khetkhuan (Thailand) Orawan Paranang
2014	Bandar Seri Begawan	(Thailand) Orawan Paranang (Thailand) Apichaya Sritavarit	(Singapore) Lin Ye (Singapore) Yee Herng Hwee	(Singapore) Ang Wan Qi (Singapore) Tay Hui Li
2014	Bandar Seri Begawan	(Thailand) Orawan Paranang (Thailand) Apichaya Sritavarit	(Singapore) Lin Ye (Singapore) Yee Herng Hwee	(Vietnam) Nguyen Ngoc Yen Nhi (Vietnam) Pham Thi Thu Huong
2015	Kuala Lumpur	(Thailand) Orawan Paranang (Thailand) Tamolwan Khetkhuan	(Vietnam) Pham Thi Thu Huong (Vietnam) Vu Thi Thu Ha	(Singapore) Yee Herng Hwee (Singapore) Ang Wan Qi
2015	Kuala Lumpur	(Thailand) Orawan Paranang (Thailand) Tamolwan Khetkhuan	(Vietnam) Pham Thi Thu Huong (Vietnam) Vu Thi Thu Ha	(Singapore) Lim Eunice (Singapore) Tan En Hui
2016	Phnom Penh	(Singapore) Tan En Hui (Singapore) Zhang Wanling	(Singapore) Ang Wan Qi (Singapore) Nicole Lew Zermaine	(Thailand) (Thailand)
2016	Phnom Penh	(Singapore) Tan En Hui (Singapore) Zhang Wanling	(Singapore) Ang Wan Qi (Singapore) Nicole Lew Zermaine	(Thailand) (Thailand)
2017	Singapore	(Singapore) Tan En Hui (Singapore) Zhang Wanling	(Singapore) Goi Rui Xuan (Singapore) Wong Xinru	(Singapore) Lu Hua Yu (Singapore) Koh Kai Xin Pearlyn
2017	Singapore	(Singapore) Tan En Hui (Singapore) Zhang Wanling	(Singapore) Goi Rui Xuan (Singapore) Wong Xinru	(Thailand) Cathareeya Poungsri (Thailand) Jinnipa Sawettabut
2018	Naga	(Singapore) Goi Rui Xuan (Singapore) Wong Xinru	(Thailand) Jininipa Sawettabut (Thailand) Monapsorn Saritapirak	(Singapore) Tee Ai Xin (Malaysia) Karen Lyne Anak Dick
2018	Naga	(Singapore) Goi Rui Xuan (Singapore) Wong Xinru	(Thailand) Jininipa Sawettabut (Thailand) Monapsorn Saritapirak	(Singapore) Zhang Wanling (Singapore) Koh Kai Xin Pearlyn
2019	Bangkok	(Malaysia) Karen Lyne Anak Dick (Malaysia) Tee Ai Xin	(Singapore) Goi Rui Xuan (Singapore) Wong Xin Ru	(Singapore) Koh Kai Xin Pearlyn (Singapore) Tan Li Lin Jassy
2019	Bangkok	(Malaysia) Karen Lyne Anak Dick (Malaysia) Tee Ai Xin	(Singapore) Goi Rui Xuan (Singapore) Wong Xin Ru	(Thailand) Pornkanok Muangwhan (Thailand) Papatchaya Hoarakkit

==== Junior Mixed Doubles ====
Year	Host city	Gold	Silver	Bronze
1993	Kuala Lumpur			
1994				
1995				
1996	Kuala Lumpur			
1998				
2000				
2001	Ipoh			
2002	Singapore			
2003				
2004				
2005	Bandar Seri Begawan			
2006	Bangkok			
2007	Laos			
2008	Kuala Lumpur			
2009	Bangkok			
2010	Phnom Penh	(Singapore) Clarence Chew (Singapore) Li Siyun Isabelle	(Singapore) Lim Jie Yang (Singapore) Kwa Hui Qi	(Indonesia) Rocky Christofel Eman (Indonesia) Stella Friska Palit
2010	Phnom Penh	(Singapore) Clarence Chew (Singapore) Li Siyun Isabelle	(Singapore) Lim Jie Yang (Singapore) Kwa Hui Qi	(Thailand) Tanapol Santiwattanatarm (Thailand) Suthasini Sawettabut
2011	Hai Duong	(Singapore) Chew Clarence (Singapore)		
2012	Yogyakarta	(Thailand) Padasak Tanviriyavechakul (Thailand) Rattanavongsa Rattanaporn	(Malaysia) Lee Rou You (Malaysia) Haiqal Muhamad Ashraf	(Singapore) Chew Clarence (Singapore) Li Siyun Isabelle
2012	Yogyakarta	(Thailand) Padasak Tanviriyavechakul (Thailand) Rattanavongsa Rattanaporn	(Malaysia) Lee Rou You (Malaysia) Haiqal Muhamad Ashraf	(Vietnam) (Vietnam)
2013	Manila	(Singapore) Clarence Chew (Singapore) Lin Ye	(Singapore) Kerry Tan (Singapore) Yee Herng Hwee	(Singapore) Tay Jit Kiat (Singapore) Ang Wan Qi
2013	Manila	(Singapore) Clarence Chew (Singapore) Lin Ye	(Singapore) Kerry Tan (Singapore) Yee Herng Hwee	(Thailand) Padasak Tanviriyavechakul (Thailand) Piyaporn Pannak
2014	Bandar Seri Begawan	(Thailand) Supanat Wisutmaythangkoon (Thailand) Orawan Paranang	(Singapore) Edric Lim Zheng Jie (Singapore) Lin Ye	(Singapore) Darren Loy (Singapore) Ang Wan Qi
2014	Bandar Seri Begawan	(Thailand) Supanat Wisutmaythangkoon (Thailand) Orawan Paranang	(Singapore) Edric Lim Zheng Jie (Singapore) Lin Ye	(Thailand) Kotcharuk Sookpraserd (Thailand) Jarinya Pramuansin
2015	Kuala Lumpur	(Thailand) Pattaratorn Passara (Thailand) Tamolwan Khetkhuan	(Thailand) Sirawit Puangthip (Thailand) Orawan Paranang	(Philippines) (Philippines)
2015	Kuala Lumpur	(Thailand) Pattaratorn Passara (Thailand) Tamolwan Khetkhuan	(Thailand) Sirawit Puangthip (Thailand) Orawan Paranang	(Singapore) Yin Jing Yuan (Singapore) Ang Wan Qi
2016	Phnom Penh	(Singapore) Maxxe Tay (Singapore) Tan En Hui	(Vietnam) (Vietnam)	(Singapore) Ethan Poh Shao Feng (Singapore) Nicole Lew Zermaine
2016	Phnom Penh	(Singapore) Maxxe Tay (Singapore) Tan En Hui	(Vietnam) (Vietnam)	(Singapore) Lucas Tan (Singapore) Zhang Wanling
2017	Singapore	(Singapore) Ethan Poh Shao Feng (Singapore) Wong Xin Ru	(Singapore) Gerald Yu (Singapore) Goi Rui Xuan	(Philippines) Jann Mari Nayre (Philippines) Jannah Maryam Romero
2017	Singapore	(Singapore) Ethan Poh Shao Feng (Singapore) Wong Xin Ru	(Singapore) Gerald Yu (Singapore) Goi Rui Xuan	(Thailand) Pattaratorn Passara (Thailand) Jinnipa Sawettabut
2018	Naga	(Singapore) Pang Yew En Koen (Singapore) Goi Rui Xuan	(Singapore) Koh Song Jun Dominic (Singapore) Wong Xin Ru	(Singapore) Gerald Yu (Singapore) Koh Kai Xin Pearlyn
2018	Naga	(Singapore) Pang Yew En Koen (Singapore) Goi Rui Xuan	(Singapore) Koh Song Jun Dominic (Singapore) Wong Xin Ru	(Singapore) Chua Shao Han Josh (Singapore) Zhang Wanling
2019	Bangkok	(Singapore) Pang Yew En Koen (Singapore) Goi Rui Xuan	(Thailand) Yanapong Panagitgun (Thailand) Thapanee Pormma	(Singapore) Chua Shao Han Josh (Singapore) Koh Kai Xin Pearlyn
2019	Bangkok	(Singapore) Pang Yew En Koen (Singapore) Goi Rui Xuan	(Thailand) Yanapong Panagitgun (Thailand) Thapanee Pormma	(Singapore) Koh Song Jun Dominic (Singapore) Wong Xin Ru

==== Junior Boys' Team ====
Year	Host City	Gold	Silver	Bronze
1993	Kuala Lumpur			
1994				
1995				
1996	Kuala Lumpur			
1998				
2000				
2001	Ipoh			
2002	Singapore			
2003				
2004				
2005	Bandar Seri Begawan			
2006	Bangkok			
2007	Laos			
2008	Kuala Lumpur			
2009	Bangkok			
2010	Phnom Penh	Vietnam	Indonesia	Singapore
2010	Phnom Penh	Vietnam	Indonesia	Thailand
2011	Hai Duong	Singapore		
2012	Yogyakarta	Thailand	Singapore	
2013	Manila	Thailand	Singapore	Malaysia
2013	Manila	Thailand	Singapore	Vietnam
2014	Bandar Seri Begawan	Thailand	Singapore	Indonesia
2014	Bandar Seri Begawan	Thailand	Singapore	Vietnam
2015	Kuala Lumpur	Thailand	Singapore	Malaysia
2015	Kuala Lumpur	Thailand	Singapore	Vietnam
2016	Phnom Penh	Singapore		
2017	Singapore	Thailand	Singapore	Malaysia
2017	Singapore	Thailand	Singapore	Vietnam
2018	Naga	Singapore	Thailand	Malaysia
2018	Naga	Singapore	Thailand	Vietnam
2019	Bangkok	Singapore	Thailand	Malaysia
2019	Bangkok	Singapore	Thailand	Myanmar

==== Junior Girls' Team ====
Year	Host City	Gold	Silver	Bronze
1993	Kuala Lumpur			
1994				
1995				
1996	Kuala Lumpur			
1998				
2000				
2001	Ipoh			
2002	Singapore			
2003				
2004				
2005	Bandar Seri Begawan			
2006	Bangkok			
2007	Laos			
2008	Kuala Lumpur			
2009	Bangkok			
2010	Phnom Penh	Singapore	Thailand	Malaysia
2010	Phnom Penh	Singapore	Thailand	Vietnam
2011	Hai Duong			
2012	Yogyakarta	Singapore	Thailand	Vietnam
2013	Manila	Singapore	Thailand	Malaysia
2013	Manila	Singapore	Thailand	Vietnam
2014	Bandar Seri Begawan	Singapore	Thailand	Indonesia
2014	Bandar Seri Begawan	Singapore	Thailand	Vietnam
2015	Kuala Lumpur	Thailand	Singapore	Malaysia
2015	Kuala Lumpur	Thailand	Singapore	Vietnam
2016	Phnom Penh	Singapore		
2017	Singapore	Singapore	Malaysia	Thailand
2017	Singapore	Singapore	Malaysia	Vietnam
2018	Naga	Malaysia	Thailand	Singapore
2018	Naga	Malaysia	Thailand	Vietnam
2019	Bangkok	Singapore	Malaysia	Thailand
2019	Bangkok	Singapore	Malaysia	Vietnam

=== Cadets (U-15) ===
==== Cadet Boys' Singles ====
Year	Host city	Gold	Silver	Bronze
1993	Kuala Lumpur			
1994				
1995				
1996	Kuala Lumpur			
1998				
2000				
2001	Ipoh			
2002	Singapore			
2003				
2004				
2005	Bandar Seri Begawan			
2006	Bangkok			
2007	Laos			
2008	Kuala Lumpur			
2009	Bangkok			
2010	Phnom Penh	(Malaysia) Padasak Tanviriyavechakul	(Thailand) Suchat Pitakgulsiri	(Singapore) Clarence Chew
2010	Phnom Penh	(Malaysia) Padasak Tanviriyavechakul	(Thailand) Suchat Pitakgulsiri	(Singapore) Kerry Tan
2011	Hai Duong			
2012	Yogyakarta	(Singapore) Yin Jing Yuan		
2013	Manila	(Malaysia) Leong Chee Feng	(Thailand) Sirawit Puangthip	(Philippines) Jann Mari Nayre
2013	Manila	(Malaysia) Leong Chee Feng	(Thailand) Sirawit Puangthip	(Singapore) Darren Loy
2014	Bandar Seri Begawan	(Singapore) Lucas Tan	(Thailand) Yanapong Panagitgun	(Philippines) Jann Mari Nayre
2014	Bandar Seri Begawan	(Singapore) Lucas Tan	(Thailand) Yanapong Panagitgun	(Thailand) Pattaratorn Passara
2015	Kuala Lumpur	(Thailand) Yannapong Panagitgun	(Thailand) Varote Shotelersuk	(Malaysia) Javen Choong
2015	Kuala Lumpur	(Thailand) Yannapong Panagitgun	(Thailand) Varote Shotelersuk	(Singapore) Gerald Yu
2016	Phnom Penh	(Singapore) Beh Kun Ting	(Singapore) Gerald Yu	(Singapore) Pang Yew En Koen
2016	Phnom Penh	(Singapore) Beh Kun Ting	(Singapore) Gerald Yu	(Thailand)
2017	Singapore	(Singapore) Pang Yew En Koen	(Thailand) Chetthanabodi Chanpen	(Malaysia) Christopher Isaac Goh Kho
2017	Singapore	(Singapore) Pang Yew En Koen	(Thailand) Chetthanabodi Chanpen	(Malaysia) Danny Ng Wann Sing
2018	Naga	(Singapore) Yan Kai Andy Wong	(Malaysia) Wong Qi Shen	(Singapore) Izaac Quek Yong
2018	Naga	(Singapore) Yan Kai Andy Wong	(Malaysia) Wong Qi Shen	(Thailand)
2019	Bangkok	(Singapore) Izaac Quek Yong	(Singapore) Daniel Ng	(Malaysia) Tan Yi Heng
2019	Bangkok	(Singapore) Izaac Quek Yong	(Singapore) Daniel Ng	(Thailand) Sitisak Nuchchart

==== Cadet Girls' Singles ====
Year	Host city	Gold	Silver	Bronze
1993	Kuala Lumpur			
1994				
1995				
1996	Kuala Lumpur			
1998				
2000				
2001	Ipoh			
2002	Singapore			
2003				
2004				
2005	Bandar Seri Begawan		(Philippines) Ian Lariba	
2006	Bangkok			(Philippines) Ian Lariba
2007	Laos			
2008	Kuala Lumpur			
2009	Bangkok			
2010	Phnom Penh	(Vietnam) Nguyen Hong Tam	(Thailand) Piyaporn Pannak	(Indonesia) Mira Fitri
2010	Phnom Penh	(Vietnam) Nguyen Hong Tam	(Thailand) Piyaporn Pannak	(Singapore) Lam Teng Si
2011	Hai Duong			
2012	Yogyakarta	(Thailand) Tamolwan Khetkhuan	(Singapore) Ang Wan Qi	(Singapore) Ng Xue Qi
2012	Yogyakarta	(Thailand) Tamolwan Khetkhuan	(Singapore) Ang Wan Qi	(Vietnam)
2013	Manila	(Singapore) Ang Wan Qi	(Thailand) Monapsorn Saritapirak	(Malaysia) Amanda Wong
2013	Manila	(Singapore) Ang Wan Qi	(Thailand) Monapsorn Saritapirak	(Malaysia) Angeline Tang
2014	Bandar Seri Begawan	(Thailand) Cathareeya Poungsri	(Thailand) Monapsorn Saritapirakt	(Indonesia) Rina Sintya
2014	Bandar Seri Begawan	(Thailand) Cathareeya Poungsri	(Thailand) Monapsorn Saritapirakt	(Indonesia) Desi Ramandanti
2015	Kuala Lumpur	(Singapore) Nicole Lew Zermaine	(Thailand) Jinnipa Sawettabut	(Singapore) Zhang Wanling
2015	Kuala Lumpur	(Singapore) Nicole Lew Zermaine	(Thailand) Jinnipa Sawettabut	(Singapore) Tay Hui Wen
2016	Phnom Penh	(Singapore) Goi Rui Xuan	(Singapore) Wong Xin Ru	(Singapore) Pearlyn Koh Kai Xin
2016	Phnom Penh	(Singapore) Goi Rui Xuan	(Singapore) Wong Xin Ru	(Thailand)
2017	Singapore	(Thailand) Nanapat Kola	(Malaysia) Kuan E. Xian	(Malaysia) Karen Lyne Dick
2017	Singapore	(Thailand) Nanapat Kola	(Malaysia) Kuan E. Xian	(Vietnam) Bui Ngoc Lan
2018	Naga	(Singapore) Zhou Jingyi	(Singapore) Ser Lin Qian	(Philippines) Kheith Rhynne Cruz
2018	Naga	(Singapore) Zhou Jingyi	(Singapore) Ser Lin Qian	(Singapore) Tan Zhao Yun
2019	Bangkok	(Singapore) Zhou Jingyi	(Thailand) Wanwisa Aueawiriyayothin	(Singapore) Ser Lin Qian
2019	Bangkok	(Singapore) Zhou Jingyi	(Thailand) Wanwisa Aueawiriyayothin	(Singapore) Tan Zhao Yun

==== Cadet Boys' Doubles ====
Year	Host city	Gold	Silver	Bronze
1993	Kuala Lumpur			
1994				
1995				
1996	Kuala Lumpur			
1998				
2000				
2001	Ipoh			
2002	Singapore			
2003				
2004				
2005	Bandar Seri Begawan			
2006	Bangkok			
2007	Laos			
2008	Kuala Lumpur			
2009	Bangkok			
2010	Phnom Penh	(Singapore) Clarence Chew (Singapore) Kerry Tan	(Thailand) Suchat Pitakgulsiri (Thailand) Padasak Tanviriyavechakul	(Malaysia) Foo Dunley (Malaysia) Leong Jie Wei
2010	Phnom Penh	(Singapore) Clarence Chew (Singapore) Kerry Tan	(Thailand) Suchat Pitakgulsiri (Thailand) Padasak Tanviriyavechakul	(Vietnam) Nguyen Thanh Nam (Vietnam) Doan Ba Tuan Anh
2011	Hai Duong			
2012	Yogyakarta	(Malaysia) Leong Chee Feng (Malaysia) Clement Sim Kwong Zhi	(Indonesia) (Indonesia)	(Singapore) Yin Jing Yuan (Singapore) Lim Zheng Jie Edric
2012	Yogyakarta	(Malaysia) Leong Chee Feng (Malaysia) Clement Sim Kwong Zhi	(Indonesia) (Indonesia)	(Indonesia) (Indonesia)
2013	Manila	(Thailand) Sirawit Puangthip (Thailand) Chaiyadej Moungwhan	(Singapore) Darren Loy (Singapore) Maxxe Tay	(Malaysia) Leong Chee Feng (Malaysia) Chua Zhong Ling
2013	Manila	(Thailand) Sirawit Puangthip (Thailand) Chaiyadej Moungwhan	(Singapore) Darren Loy (Singapore) Maxxe Tay	(Vietnam) Nguyen Ang Duc (Vietnam) Nguyen Trung Kien
2014	Bandar Seri Begawan	(Thailand) Pattaratorn Passara (Thailand) Yanapong Panagitgun	(Indonesia) Rahmat N Pakaya (Indonesia) Marcello	(Singapore) Ethan Poh Shao Feng (Singapore) Lucas Tan
2014	Bandar Seri Begawan	(Thailand) Pattaratorn Passara (Thailand) Yanapong Panagitgun	(Indonesia) Rahmat N Pakaya (Indonesia) Marcello	(Vietnam) Nguyen Ang Duc (Vietnam) Vo Huu Quoc
2015	Kuala Lumpur	(Malaysia) Javen Choong (Malaysia) Chin Wen Jie	(Thailand) Yannapong Panagitgun (Thailand) Varote Shotelersuk	(Philippines) Jann Mari Nayre (Philippines) Reynaldo Templado
2015	Kuala Lumpur	(Malaysia) Javen Choong (Malaysia) Chin Wen Jie	(Thailand) Yannapong Panagitgun (Thailand) Varote Shotelersuk	(Singapore) Beh Kun Ting (Singapore) Gerald Yu
2016	Phnom Penh	(Singapore) Beh Kun Ting (Singapore) Pang Yew En Koen	(Malaysia) (Malaysia)	(Philippines) (Philippines)
2016	Phnom Penh	(Singapore) Beh Kun Ting (Singapore) Pang Yew En Koen	(Malaysia) (Malaysia)	(Thailand) (Thailand)
2017	Singapore	(Singapore) Dominic Song Jun Koh (Singapore) Pang Yew En Koen	(Thailand) Chetthanabodi Chanpen (Thailand) Thyme Sanglertsilpachai	(Malaysia) Christopher Isaac Goh Kho (Malaysia) Tan Yi Heng
2017	Singapore	(Singapore) Dominic Song Jun Koh (Singapore) Pang Yew En Koen	(Thailand) Chetthanabodi Chanpen (Thailand) Thyme Sanglertsilpachai	(Vietnam) Huynh Anh Tuan (Vietnam) Nguyen Thanh Tuan
2018	Naga	(Malaysia) Amos Ling Yi Heng (Malaysia) Wong Qi Shen	(Thailand) Chetthanabodi Chanpen (Thailand) Puripong Saelee	(Singapore) Izaac Quek Yong (Singapore) Yan Kai Andy Wong
2018	Naga	(Malaysia) Amos Ling Yi Heng (Malaysia) Wong Qi Shen	(Thailand) Chetthanabodi Chanpen (Thailand) Puripong Saelee	(Vietnam) Nguyen Doan Thuc (Vietnam) Vu Manh Huy
2019	Bangkok	(Singapore) Izaac Quek Yong (Singapore) Daniel Ng	(Malaysia) Tan Yi Heng (Malaysia) Lee Yong Yi	(Thailand) Sitisak Nuchchart (Thailand) Napat Thanmathikom
2019	Bangkok	(Singapore) Izaac Quek Yong (Singapore) Daniel Ng	(Malaysia) Tan Yi Heng (Malaysia) Lee Yong Yi	(Vietnam) Liong Huu Duy (Vietnam) Nguyen Duy Phong

==== Cadet Girls' Doubles ====
Year	Host city	Gold	Silver	Bronze
1993	Kuala Lumpur			
1994				
1995				
1996	Kuala Lumpur			
1998				
2000				
2001	Ipoh			
2002	Singapore			
2003				
2004				
2005	Bandar Seri Begawan			
2006	Bangkok			
2007	Laos			
2008	Kuala Lumpur			
2009	Bangkok			
2010	Phnom Penh	(Thailand) Tamolwan Khetkuen (Thailand) Piyaporn Pannak	(Malaysia) Lee Rou You (Malaysia) Lim Ja Ja	(Indonesia) Mira Fitri (Indonesia) Kharisma
2010	Phnom Penh	(Thailand) Tamolwan Khetkuen (Thailand) Piyaporn Pannak	(Malaysia) Lee Rou You (Malaysia) Lim Ja Ja	(Singapore) Lam Teng Si (Singapore) Wong Hoi Ching
2011	Hai Duong			
2012	Yogyakarta	(Singapore) Ang Wan Qi (Singapore) Yee Herng Hwee	(Thailand) Tamolwan Khetkhuan (Thailand)	
2013	Manila	(Malaysia) Angeline Tang (Malaysia) Amanda Wong	(Vietnam) Vu Thi Thu Ha (Vietnam) Mai Tu Uyen	(Philippines) Emy Rose Dael (Philippines) Ann Gella Borbon
2013	Manila	(Malaysia) Angeline Tang (Malaysia) Amanda Wong	(Vietnam) Vu Thi Thu Ha (Vietnam) Mai Tu Uyen	(Singapore) Ang Wan Qi (Singapore) Wong Yan Lin Gladys
2014	Bandar Seri Begawan	(Thailand) Cathareeya Poungsri (Thailand) Monapsorn Saritapirak	(Indonesia) Rina Sintya (Indonesia) Desi Ramandanti	(Philippines) Jannah Maryam Romero (Philippines) Ma. Angelica Sanchez
2014	Bandar Seri Begawan	(Thailand) Cathareeya Poungsri (Thailand) Monapsorn Saritapirak	(Indonesia) Rina Sintya (Indonesia) Desi Ramandanti	(Singapore) Linda Zeng Ziyue (Singapore) Zhang Wanling
2015	Kuala Lumpur	(Thailand) Jinnipa Sawettabut (Thailand) Monapsorn Saritapirak	(Singapore) Zhang Wanling (Singapore) Nicole Lew Zermaine	(Malaysia) Alice Li Sian Chang (Malaysia) Tey Ka Ying
2015	Kuala Lumpur	(Thailand) Jinnipa Sawettabut (Thailand) Monapsorn Saritapirak	(Singapore) Zhang Wanling (Singapore) Nicole Lew Zermaine	(Philippines) Jannah Maryam Romero (Philippines) Alexandra Reyes
2016	Phnom Penh		(Singapore) Goi Rui Xuan (Singapore) Pearlyn Koh Kai Xin	
2017	Singapore	(Malaysia) Kuan E. Xian (Singapore) Karen Lyne Dick	(Vietnam) Bui Ngoc Lan (Philippines) Do Nguyen Uyen Nhi	(Singapore) Tan Jassy Li Lin (Singapore) Zhou Jing Yi
2017	Singapore	(Malaysia) Kuan E. Xian (Singapore) Karen Lyne Dick	(Vietnam) Bui Ngoc Lan (Philippines) Do Nguyen Uyen Nhi	(Singapore) Idys Koh Gaoh Cai (Singapore) Ser Lin Qian
2018	Naga	(Singapore) Zhou Jingyi (Singapore) Ser Lin Qian	(Philippines) Khieth Rynne Cruz (Philippines) Althea Jade Gudes	(Thailand) Wanwisa Aueawiriyayothin (Thailand) Phantita Pinyopisan
2018	Naga	(Singapore) Zhou Jingyi (Singapore) Ser Lin Qian	(Philippines) Khieth Rynne Cruz (Philippines) Althea Jade Gudes	(Vietnam) Nguyen Thi Mai Phuong (Vietnam) Tran Mai Ngoc
2019	Bangkok	(Thailand) Wanwisa Aueawiriyayothin (Thailand) Phantita Pinyopisan	(Vietnam) Nguyen Thi Mai Phuong (Vietnam) Tran Mai Ngoc	(Singapore) Zhou Jingyi (Singapore) Ser Lin Qian
2019	Bangkok	(Thailand) Wanwisa Aueawiriyayothin (Thailand) Phantita Pinyopisan	(Vietnam) Nguyen Thi Mai Phuong (Vietnam) Tran Mai Ngoc	(Thailand) Piyapath Pilaisaengsuree (Thailand) Nattaya Wantaneeyakul

==== Cadet Boys' Team ====
Year	Host city	Gold	Silver	Bronze
1993	Kuala Lumpur			
1994				
1995				
1996	Kuala Lumpur			
1998				
2000				
2001	Ipoh			
2002	Singapore			
2003				
2004				
2005	Bandar Seri Begawan			
2006	Bangkok			
2007	Laos			
2008	Kuala Lumpur			
2009	Bangkok			
2010	Phnom Penh			
2011	Hai Duong			
2012	Yogyakarta			
2013	Manila	Thailand	Singapore	Philippines
2013	Manila	Thailand	Singapore	Vietnam
2014	Bandar Seri Begawan	Singapore	Thailand	Indonesia
2014	Bandar Seri Begawan	Singapore	Thailand	Vietnam
2015	Kuala Lumpur	Thailand	Malaysia	Philippines
2015	Kuala Lumpur	Thailand	Malaysia	Singapore
2016	Phnom Penh	Singapore		
2017	Singapore	Singapore	Malaysia	Thailand
2017	Singapore	Singapore	Malaysia	Vietnam
2018	Naga	Singapore	Malaysia	Indonesia
2018	Naga	Singapore	Malaysia	Vietnam
2019	Bangkok	Singapore	Malaysia	Thailand
2019	Bangkok	Singapore	Malaysia	Vietnam

==== Cadet Girls' Team ====
Year	Host city	Gold	Silver	Bronze
1993	Kuala Lumpur			
1994				
1995				
1996	Kuala Lumpur			
1998				
2000				
2001	Ipoh			
2002	Singapore			
2003				
2004				
2005	Bandar Seri Begawan			
2006	Bangkok			
2007	Laos			
2008	Kuala Lumpur			
2009	Bangkok			
2010	Phnom Penh			
2011	Hai Duong			
2012	Yogyakarta			
2013	Manila	Singapore	Malaysia	Thailand
2013	Manila	Singapore	Malaysia	Vietnam
2014	Bandar Seri Begawan	Indonesia	Thailand	Malaysia
2014	Bandar Seri Begawan	Indonesia	Thailand	Vietnam
2015	Kuala Lumpur	Thailand	Singapore	Malaysia
2015	Kuala Lumpur	Thailand	Singapore	Vietnam
2016	Phnom Penh	Singapore	Vietnam	Malaysia
2016	Phnom Penh	Singapore	Vietnam	Philippines
2017	Singapore	Malaysia	Vietnam	Singapore
2017	Singapore	Malaysia	Vietnam	Thailand
2018	Naga	Singapore	Indonesia	Philippines
2018	Naga	Singapore	Indonesia	Thailand
2019	Bangkok	Singapore	Thailand	Malaysia
2019	Bangkok	Singapore	Thailand	Vietnam

== See also ==
- ITTF World Youth Championships
- Asian Junior and Cadet Table Tennis Championships
- Asian Table Tennis Union
