= Table tennis at the 2021 SEA Games – Women's doubles =

Table tennis – Women's doubles at the 2021 SEA Games
- Venue: Hải Dương Gymnasium
- Dates: 17–18 May 2022
- Competitors: 24 from 7 nations

Medalists
gold medal	Suthasini Sawettabut; Orawan Paranang	Thailand
silver medal	Zhou Jingyi; Zeng Jian	Singapore
bronze medal	Ho Ying; Karen Lyne Anak Dick	Malaysia
bronze medal	Nguyễn Thị Nga; Trần Mai Ngọc	Vietnam

The women's doubles competition of the table tennis event at the 2021 SEA Games was held from 17 to 18 May at the Hải Dương Gymnasium in Hải Dương, Vietnam.

== Participating nations ==
A total of 24 athletes from seven nations competed in women's doubles table tennis at the 2021 Southeast Asian Games:

- Cambodia (2)
- Laos (2)
- Malaysia (4)
- Philippines (4)
- Singapore (4)
- Thailand (4)
- Vietnam (4)

== Schedule ==
All times are Vietnam Time (UTC+07:00).

Date	Time	Round
Tuesday, 17 May 2022	15:00	Round of 16
Tuesday, 17 May 2022	20:00	Quarterfinals
Wednesday, 18 May 2022	11:30	Semifinals
Wednesday, 18 May 2022	15:00	Final

== Results ==
Source: Event Summary

Round of 16; 17 May 15:00
(Thailand) S Sawettabut (Thailand) O Paranang
Bye
(Philippines) ER Dael (Philippines) SM Otanes	6	11	9	0
(Malaysia) Tee AX (Malaysia) Chang ALS	11	13	11	3
(Vietnam) Nguyễn TN (Vietnam) Trần MN	11	11	11	3
(Laos) T Southammavong (Laos) N Kongphet	3	7	4	0
Bye
(Singapore) Goi RX (Singapore) Wong XR
(Thailand) J Sawettabut (Thailand) W Aueawiriyayothin
Bye
(Cambodia) Bo I (Cambodia) Khiev C	4	4	5	0
(Malaysia) Ho Y (Malaysia) Karen LAD	11	11	11	3
(Vietnam) Nguyễn KDK (Vietnam) Vũ HT	7	8	11	11	9	2
(Philippines) AJ Laude (Philippines) KR Cruz	11	11	8	9	11	3
Bye
(Singapore) Zhou J (Singapore) Zeng J

Quarterfinal; 17 May 20:00
(Thailand) S Sawettabut (Thailand) O Paranang	11	11	11	3
(Malaysia) Tee AX (Malaysia) Chang ALS	1	7	1	0
(Vietnam) Nguyễn TN (Vietnam) Trần MN	11	11	11	3
(Singapore) Goi RX (Singapore) Wong XR	4	4	6	0
(Thailand) J Sawettabut (Thailand) W Aueawiriyayothin	6	5	8	0
(Malaysia) Ho Y (Malaysia) Karen LAD	11	11	11	3
(Philippines) AJ Laude (Philippines) KR Cruz	7	6	7	0
(Singapore) Zhou J (Singapore) Zeng J	11	11	11	3

Semifinal; 18 May 11:30
(Thailand) S Sawettabut (Thailand) O Paranang	11	11	11	3
(Vietnam) Nguyễn TN (Vietnam) Trần MN	6	5	5	0
(Malaysia) Ho Y (Malaysia) Karen LAD	11	2	5	0
(Singapore) Zhou J (Singapore) Zeng J	13	11	11	3

Final; 18 May 15:00
(Thailand) S Sawettabut (Thailand) O Paranang	11	11	11	3
(Singapore) Zhou J (Singapore) Zeng J	9	4	7	0
