= 2018 South East Asian Junior and Cadet Table Tennis Championships =

Tournament details
- Dates: 4–8 July 2018
- Edition: 24th
- Venue: Robinsons Place Naga
- Location: Naga City, Philippines

The 24th South East Asian Junior and Cadet Table Tennis Championships 2018 were held in Naga City, Philippines, from 4 to 8 July 2018.

== Medal summary ==
=== Events ===
Event	Gold	Silver	Bronze
Junior Boys' singles	Singapore; Pang Yew En Koen	Singapore; Chua Shao Han Josh	Singapore; Yu Zong Jun Gerald
Junior Boys' singles	Singapore; Pang Yew En Koen	Singapore; Chua Shao Han Josh	Thailand; Yanapong Panagitgun
Junior Girls' singles	Singapore; Wong Xinru	Malaysia; Karen Lyne Anak Dick	Philippines; Jannah Maryam Romero
Junior Girls' singles	Singapore; Wong Xinru	Malaysia; Karen Lyne Anak Dick	Thailand; Nanapat Kola
Junior Boys' doubles	Singapore; Pang Yew En Koen; Koh Song Jun Dominic	Thailand; Yanapong Panagitgun; Supakron Pankhaoyoy	Singapore; Gerald Yu; Chua Shao Han Josh
Junior Boys' doubles	Singapore; Pang Yew En Koen; Koh Song Jun Dominic	Thailand; Yanapong Panagitgun; Supakron Pankhaoyoy	Thailand; Tananan Tantakool; Thyme Sanglertsilpachai
Junior Girls' doubles	Singapore; Wong Xinru; Goi Rui Xuan	Thailand; Jininipa Sawettabut; Monapsorn Saritapirak	Malaysia; Tee Ai Xin; Karen Lyne Anak Dick
Junior Girls' doubles	Singapore; Wong Xinru; Goi Rui Xuan	Thailand; Jininipa Sawettabut; Monapsorn Saritapirak	Singapore; Zhang Wanling; Koh Kai Xin Pearlyn
Junior Mixed doubles	Singapore; Pang Yew En Koen; Goi Rui Xuan	Singapore; Koh Song Jun Dominic; Wong Xin Ru	Singapore; Gerald Yu; Koh Kai Xin Pearlyn
Junior Mixed doubles	Singapore; Pang Yew En Koen; Goi Rui Xuan	Singapore; Koh Song Jun Dominic; Wong Xin Ru	Singapore; Chua Shao Han Josh; Zhang Wanling
Junior Boys' team	Singapore; Pang Yew En Koen; Gerald Yu; Koh Song Jun Dominic; Chua Shao Han Josh	Thailand; Yanapong Panagitgun; Tananan Tantakool; Supakron Pankhaoyoy; Thyme Sanglertsilpachai	Malaysia
Junior Boys' team	Singapore; Pang Yew En Koen; Gerald Yu; Koh Song Jun Dominic; Chua Shao Han Josh	Thailand; Yanapong Panagitgun; Tananan Tantakool; Supakron Pankhaoyoy; Thyme Sanglertsilpachai	Vietnam
Junior Girls' team	Malaysia	Thailand; Nanapat Kola; Jininipa Sawettabut; Monapsorn Saritapirak	Singapore; Goi Rui Xuan; Wong Xin Ru; Koh Kai Xin Pearlyn; Zhang Wanling
Junior Girls' team	Malaysia	Thailand; Nanapat Kola; Jininipa Sawettabut; Monapsorn Saritapirak	Vietnam
Cadet Boys' singles	Singapore; Yan Kai Andy Wong	Malaysia; Wong Qi Shen	Singapore; Izaac Quek Yong
Cadet Boys' singles	Singapore; Yan Kai Andy Wong	Malaysia; Wong Qi Shen	Thailand
Cadet Girls' singles	Singapore; Zhou Jingyi	Thailand; Wanwisa Aueawiriyayothin	Singapore; Ser Lin Qian
Cadet Girls' singles	Singapore; Zhou Jingyi	Thailand; Wanwisa Aueawiriyayothin	Singapore; Tan Zhao Yun
Cadet Boys' doubles	Malaysia; Amos Ling Yi Heng; Wong Qi Shen	Thailand; Chetthanabodi Chanpen; Puripong Saelee	Singapore; Izaac Quek Yong; Yan Kai Andy Wong
Cadet Boys' doubles	Malaysia; Amos Ling Yi Heng; Wong Qi Shen	Thailand; Chetthanabodi Chanpen; Puripong Saelee	Vietnam; Nguyen Doan Thuc; Vu Manh Huy
Cadet Girls' doubles	Singapore; Zhou Jingyi; Ser Lin Qian	Philippines; Khieth Rynne Cruz; Althea Jade Gudes	Thailand; Thanathnan Choosattayanond; Phantita Pinyopisan
Cadet Girls' doubles	Singapore; Zhou Jingyi; Ser Lin Qian	Philippines; Khieth Rynne Cruz; Althea Jade Gudes	Vietnam; Tran Mai Ngoc; Nguyen Thi Mai Phuong
Cadet Boys' team	Singapore; Lim Daoyi; Yan Kai Andy Wong; Izaac Quek Yong	Malaysia	Indonesia
Cadet Boys' team	Singapore; Lim Daoyi; Yan Kai Andy Wong; Izaac Quek Yong	Malaysia	Vietnam
Cadet Girls' team	Singapore; Zhou Jingyi; Ser Lin Qian; Tan Zhao Yun	Indonesia	Philippines; Kheith Rhynne Cruz; Althea Jade Gudes; Janna Paculba
Cadet Girls' team	Singapore; Zhou Jingyi; Ser Lin Qian; Tan Zhao Yun	Indonesia	Thailand; Thanathnan Choosattayanond; Phantita Pinyopaisan; Wanvisa Aueawiriyayothin

=== Medal table ===
* Host nation (Philippines)

Rank	Nation	Gold	Silver	Bronze	Total
1	Singapore	11	2	10	23
2	Malaysia	2	3	2	7
3	Thailand	0	6	6	12
4	Philippines*	0	1	2	3
5	Indonesia	0	1	1	2
6	Vietnam	0	0	5	5
Totals (6 entries)		13	13	26	52

== See also ==
- 2018 World Junior Table Tennis Championships
- 2018 Asian Junior and Cadet Table Tennis Championships
- Asian Table Tennis Union
