= 2017 South East Asian Junior and Cadet Table Tennis Championships =

Tournament details
- Dates: 13–16 June 2017
- Edition: 23rd
- Venue: Toa Payoh Sports Hall
- Location: Singapore

The 23rd South East Asian Junior and Cadet Table Tennis Championships 2017 were held in Singapore.

== Medal summary ==
=== Events ===
Event	Gold	Silver	Bronze
Junior Boys' singles	Singapore; Ethan Poh Shao Feng	Singapore; Lucas Tan	Thailand; Pattaratorn Passara
Junior Boys' singles	Singapore; Ethan Poh Shao Feng	Singapore; Lucas Tan	Vietnam; Nguyen Anh Duc
Junior Girls' singles	Singapore; Nicole Lew Zermaine	Singapore; Eunice Zoe Lim	Malaysia; Alice Li Sian Chang
Junior Girls' singles	Singapore; Nicole Lew Zermaine	Singapore; Eunice Zoe Lim	Thailand; Jinnipa Sawettabut
Junior Boys' doubles	Thailand; Yanapong Panagitgun; Pattaratorn Passara	Thailand; Purit Verakultawan; Pankhoyoi Supakorn	Malaysia; Javen Choong; Chin Wen Jie
Junior Boys' doubles	Thailand; Yanapong Panagitgun; Pattaratorn Passara	Thailand; Purit Verakultawan; Pankhoyoi Supakorn	Singapore; Lucas Tan; Ethan Poh Shao Feng
Junior Girls' doubles	Singapore; Tan En Hui; Zhang Wanling	Singapore; Goi Rui Xuan; Wong Xinru	Thailand; Cathareeya Poungsri; Jinnipa Sawettabut
Junior Girls' doubles	Singapore; Tan En Hui; Zhang Wanling	Singapore; Goi Rui Xuan; Wong Xinru	Singapore; Lu Hua Yu; Koh Kai Xin Pearlyn
Junior Mixed doubles	Singapore; Ethan Poh Shao Feng; Wong Xinru	Singapore; Gerald Yu Zong Jun; Goi Rui Xuan	Philippines; Jann Mari Nayre; Jannah Maryam Romero
Junior Mixed doubles	Singapore; Ethan Poh Shao Feng; Wong Xinru	Singapore; Gerald Yu Zong Jun; Goi Rui Xuan	Thailand; Pattaratorn Passara; Jinnipa Sawettabut
Junior Boys' team	Thailand; Pattaratorn Passara; Yanapong Panagitgun; Supakorn Pankhoyoi; Purit Vevakultawam	Singapore	Malaysia; Javen Choong; Chin Wen Jie; Brandon Fong; Mohd Syazwan Salmi
Junior Boys' team	Thailand; Pattaratorn Passara; Yanapong Panagitgun; Supakorn Pankhoyoi; Purit Vevakultawam	Singapore	Vietnam
Junior Girls' team	Singapore; Zhang Wanling; Wong Xinru; Nicole Lew Zermaine; Goi Rui Xuan	Malaysia; Alice Li Sian Chang; Tee Ai Xin; Catherine Chan Zhe Yan; Tey Ka Ying	Thailand
Junior Girls' team	Singapore; Zhang Wanling; Wong Xinru; Nicole Lew Zermaine; Goi Rui Xuan	Malaysia; Alice Li Sian Chang; Tee Ai Xin; Catherine Chan Zhe Yan; Tey Ka Ying	Vietnam
Cadet Boys' singles	Singapore; Pang Yew En Koen	Thailand; Chetthanabodi Chanpen	Malaysia; Christopher Isaac Goh Kho
Cadet Boys' singles	Singapore; Pang Yew En Koen	Thailand; Chetthanabodi Chanpen	Malaysia; Danny Ng Wann Sing
Cadet Girls' singles	Thailand; Nanapat Kola	Malaysia; Kuan E. Xian	Malaysia; Karen Lyne Dick
Cadet Girls' singles	Thailand; Nanapat Kola	Malaysia; Kuan E. Xian	Vietnam; Bui Ngoc Lan
Cadet Boys' doubles	Singapore; Dominic Song Jun Koh; Pang Yew En Koen	Thailand; Chetthanabodi Chanpen; Thyme Sanglertsilpachai	Malaysia; Christopher Isaac Goh Kho; Tan Yi Heng
Cadet Boys' doubles	Singapore; Dominic Song Jun Koh; Pang Yew En Koen	Thailand; Chetthanabodi Chanpen; Thyme Sanglertsilpachai	Vietnam; Huynh Anh Tuan; Nguyen Thanh Tuan
Cadet Girls' doubles	Malaysia; Kuan E. Xian; Karen Lyne Dick	Vietnam; Bui Ngoc Lan; Do Nguyen Uyen Nhi	Singapore; Tan Jassy Li Lin; Zhou Jing Yi
Cadet Girls' doubles	Malaysia; Kuan E. Xian; Karen Lyne Dick	Vietnam; Bui Ngoc Lan; Do Nguyen Uyen Nhi	Singapore; Idys Koh Gaoh Cai; Ser Lin Qian
Cadet Boys' team	Singapore; Pang Yew En Koen; Andy Wong; Dominic Song Jun Koh	Malaysia; Christopher Isaac Goh Kho; Danny Ng Wann Sing; Tan Yi Heng	Thailand
Cadet Boys' team	Singapore; Pang Yew En Koen; Andy Wong; Dominic Song Jun Koh	Malaysia; Christopher Isaac Goh Kho; Danny Ng Wann Sing; Tan Yi Heng	Vietnam
Cadet Girls' team	Malaysia; Kuan E. Xian; Karen Lyne Dick; Chong Xin Yee	Vietnam	Thailand
Cadet Girls' team	Malaysia; Kuan E. Xian; Karen Lyne Dick; Chong Xin Yee	Vietnam	Singapore

=== Medal table ===
* Host nation (Singapore)

Rank	Nation	Gold	Silver	Bronze	Total
1	Singapore	8	5	5	18
2	Thailand	3	3	7	13
3	Malaysia	2	3	7	12
4	Vietnam	0	2	6	8
5	Philippines	0	0	1	1
Totals (5 entries)		13	13	26	52

== See also ==
- 2017 World Junior Table Tennis Championships
- 2017 Asian Junior and Cadet Table Tennis Championships
- Asian Table Tennis Union
