= Table tennis at the 2019 SEA Games – Women's doubles =

Table tennis – Women's doubles at the 2019 SEA Games
- Venue: Subic Bay Exhibition & Convention Center
- Dates: 6–7 December 2019
- Competitors: 22 from 6 nations

Medalists
gold medal	Orawan Paranang; Suthasini Sawettabut	Thailand
silver medal	Nanthana Komwong; Jinnipa Sawettabut	Thailand
bronze medal	Feng Tianwei; Lin Ye	Singapore
bronze medal	Wong Xin Ru; Goi Rui Xuan	Singapore

The women's doubles competition of the table tennis events at the 2019 SEA Games was held from 6 to 7 December at the Subic Bay Exhibition & Convention Center in Subic Bay Freeport Zone, Zambales, Philippines.

== Schedule ==
All times are Philippines Time (UTC+08:00).

Date	Time	Round
6 December 2019	10:00	Round of 16
6 December 2019	14:30	Quarterfinals
7 December 2019	10:00	Semifinals
7 December 2019	13:30	Finals

== Results ==
Source: Event Summary

Round of 16; 6 December 10:00
Feng Tianwei (SGP); Lin Ye (SGP)
Bye
Bye
Karen Lyne (MAS); Ho Ying (MAS)
Emy Rose Dael (PHI); Jannah Romero (PHI)	2
Nguyen Dieu Khanh (VIE); Nguyen Thanh Thu (VIE)	3
Bye
Nanthana Komwong (THA); Jinnipa Sawettabut (THA)
Wong Xin Ru (SGP); Goi Rui Xuan (SGP)
Bye
Win Naing Naing (MYA); Soe Yanadar (MYA)	0
Kheith Rhynne Cruz (PHI); Rose Jean Fadol (PHI)	3
Alice Chang Sian (MAS); Tee Xin (MAS)	0
Tran Mai Ngoc (VIE); Mai Hoang My Trang (VIE)	3
Bye
Orawan Paranang (THA); Suthasini Sawettabut (THA)

Quarterfinal; 6 December 14:30
Feng Tianwei (SGP); Lin Ye (SGP)	3
Karen Lyne (MAS); Ho Ying (MAS)	1
Nguyen Dieu Khanh (VIE); Nguyen Thanh Thu (VIE)	2
Nanthana Komwong (THA); Jinnipa Sawettabut (THA)	3
Wong Xin Ru (SGP); Goi Rui Xuan (SGP)	3
Kheith Rhynne Cruz (PHI); Rose Jean Fadol (PHI)	2
Tran Mai Ngoc (VIE); Mai Hoang My Trang (VIE)	0
Orawan Paranang (THA); Suthasini Sawettabut (THA)	3

Semifinal; 7 December 10:00
Feng Tianwei (SGP); Lin Ye (SGP)	2
Nanthana Komwong (THA); Jinnipa Sawettabut (THA)	3
Wong Xin Ru (SGP); Goi Rui Xuan (SGP)	2
Orawan Paranang (THA); Suthasini Sawettabut (THA)	3

Gold medal match 7 December 13:30
Nanthana Komwong (THA); Jinnipa Sawettabut (THA)	0
Orawan Paranang (THA); Suthasini Sawettabut (THA)	3
