= Table tennis at the 2022 Asian Games – Women's team =

Women's team at the 2022 Asian Games
- Venue: Gongshu Canal Sports Park Gymnasium
- Date: 22–26 September 2023
- Competitors: 80 from 18 nations

Medalists
gold medal	China; Chen Meng, Chen Xingtong, Sun Yingsha, Wang Manyu, Wang Yidi
silver medal	Japan; Miwa Harimoto, Hina Hayata, Miu Hirano, Miyuu Kihara, Miyu Nagasaki
bronze medal	Thailand; Wanwisa Aueawiriyayothin, Tamolwan Khetkhuan, Orawan Paranang, Jinnipa Sawettabut, Suthasini Sawettabut
bronze medal	South Korea; Jeon Ji-hee, Lee Eun-hye, Shin Yu-bin, Suh Hyo-won, Yang Ha-eun

The women's team table tennis event at the 2022 Asian Games took place from 22 to 26 September 2023 at the Gongshu Canal Sports Park Gymnasium.

== Schedule ==
All times are China Standard Time (UTC+08:00)

Date	Time	Event
Friday, 22 September 2023	10:00	Preliminary 1
Friday, 22 September 2023	16:00	Preliminary 2
Saturday, 23 September 2023	10:00	Preliminary 3
Sunday, 24 September 2023	10:00	Round of 16
Sunday, 24 September 2023	16:00	Quarterfinals
Monday, 25 September 2023	11:00	Semifinals
Tuesday, 26 September 2023	14:00	Final

== Results ==
=== Preliminary ===
==== Group A ====
Pos	Team	Pld	W	L	MF	MA	Pts	Qualification
1	China	2	2	0	6	0	4	Quarterfinals
2	Kazakhstan	2	1	1	3	3	3	Round of 16
3	Macau	2	0	2	0	6	2	

Source: Official website

22 September	Macau	0–3	China

Seak Hui Li	0–3	Chen Meng	3–11, 2–11, 3–11
Cheong Chi Hun	0–3	Wang Manyu	2–11, 3–11, 3–11
Kuan Cheok Lam	0–3	Chen Xingtong	1–11, 3–11, 4–11

22 September	China	3–0	Kazakhstan

Sun Yingsha	3–0	Sarvinoz Mirkadirova	11–2, 11–5, 11–0
Wang Yidi	3–0	Zauresh Akasheva	11–1, 11–5, 11–8
Chen Meng	3–0	Angelina Romanovskaya	11–4, 11–3, 11–3

23 September	Kazakhstan	3–0	Macau

Sarvinoz Mirkadirova	3–1	Cheong Chi Hun	11–9, 11–5, 8–11, 11–6
Anastassiya Lavrova	3–2	Seak Hui Li	11–2, 8–11, 11–8, 5–11, 11–7
Zauresh Akasheva	3–0	Kuan Cheok Lam	11–5, 11–5, 11–4

==== Group B ====
Pos	Team	Pld	W	L	MF	MA	Pts	Qualification
1	Japan	2	2	0	6	0	4	Quarterfinals
2	Vietnam	2	1	1	3	3	3	Round of 16
3	Mongolia	2	0	2	0	6	2	

Source: Official website

22 September	Japan	3–0	Mongolia

Miu Hirano	3–0	Mönkhbatyn Undram	11–1, 11–1, 11–1
Miwa Harimoto	3–0	Batmönkhiin Bolor-Erdene	11–3, 14–12, 11–4
Miyu Nagasaki	3–0	Övgönbürgediin Baljinnyam	11–6, 11–6, 11–4

22 September	Japan	3–0	Vietnam

Miyuu Kihara	3–0	Trần Mai Ngọc	11–3, 11–7, 11–4
Miyu Nagasaki	3–0	Nguyễn Khoa Diệu Khánh	12–10, 11–7, 11–7
Hina Hayata	3–0	Bùi Ngọc Lan	11–5, 11–4, 11–3

23 September	Vietnam	3–0	Mongolia

Nguyễn Khoa Diệu Khánh	3–1	Batbayaryn Doljinzuu	11–5, 11–7, 8–11, 11–2
Trần Mai Ngọc	3–1	Batmönkhiin Bolor-Erdene	9–11, 11–8, 11–8, 11–6
Bùi Ngọc Lan	3–0	Övgönbürgediin Baljinnyam	15–13, 11–5, 11–5

==== Group C ====
Pos	Team	Pld	W	L	MF	MA	Pts	Qualification
1	North Korea	2	2	0	6	2	4	Quarterfinals
2	Chinese Taipei	2	1	1	5	3	3	Round of 16
3	Maldives	2	0	2	0	6	2	

Source: Official website

22 September	Chinese Taipei	3–0	Maldives

Cheng I-ching	3–0	Aishath Rafa Nazim	11–3, 11–3, 11–1
Chen Szu-yu	3–0	Laisa Fathuhulla Ismail	11–4, 11–4, 11–6
Li Yu-jhun	3–0	Fathimath Jumana Nimal	11–3, 11–2, 11–5

22 September	North Korea	3–2	Chinese Taipei

Kim Kum-yong	3–2	Chen Szu-yu	11–8, 5–11, 11–9, 7–11, 11–6
Pyon Song-gyong	1–3	Cheng I-ching	11–9, 9–11, 4–11, 4–11
Cha Su-yong	3–0	Li Yu-jhun	11–3, 11–8, 11–8
Kim Kum-yong	0–3	Cheng I-ching	7–11, 2–11, 3–11
Pyon Song-gyong	3–1	Chen Szu-yu	11–8, 9–11, 11–8, 11–4

23 September	Maldives	0–3	North Korea

Aishath Rafa Nazim	0–3	Pak Su-gyong	5–11, 11–13, 6–11
Laisa Fathuhulla Ismail	0–3	Kim Kum-yong	1–11, 2–11, 3–11
Fathimath Jumana Nimal	0–3	Choe Jong-im	5–11, 8–11, 2–11

==== Group D ====
Pos	Team	Pld	W	L	MF	MA	Pts	Qualification
1	South Korea	2	2	0	6	0	4	Quarterfinals
2	Thailand	2	1	1	3	3	3	Round of 16
3	Pakistan	2	0	2	0	6	2	

Source: Official website

22 September	South Korea	3–0	Pakistan

Jeon Ji-hee	3–0	Haiqa Hassan	11–4, 11–2, 11–2
Shin Yu-bin	3–0	Hoor Fawad	11–2, 11–4, 11–2
Suh Hyo-won	3–0	Perniya Zaman Khan	11–6, 11–4, 11–5

22 September	Thailand	0–3	South Korea

Suthasini Sawettabut	0–3	Shin Yu-bin	3–11, 9–11, 5–11
Orawan Paranang	0–3	Jeon Ji-hee	4–11, 2–11, 8–11
Tamolwan Khetkhuan	0–3	Suh Hyo-won	9–11, 8–11, 9–11

23 September	Pakistan	0–3	Thailand

Haiqa Hassan	0–3	Jinnipa Sawettabut	1–11, 4–11, 3–11
Hoor Fawad	0–3	Tamolwan Khetkhuan	5–11, 4–11, 3–11
Perniya Zaman Khan	0–3	Wanwisa Aueawiriyayothin	3–11, 5–11, 5–11

==== Group E ====
Pos	Team	Pld	W	L	MF	MA	Pts	Qualification
1	Hong Kong	2	2	0	6	0	4	Round of 16
2	Uzbekistan	2	1	1	3	3	3	Round of 16
3	Bahrain	2	0	2	0	6	2	

Source: Official website

22 September	Bahrain	0–3	Hong Kong

Maryam Al-Aali	1–3	Lee Ho Ching	2–11, 11–6, 2–11, 10–12
Amruta Phadke	0–3	Zhu Chengzhu	5–11, 3–11, 4–11
Fatima Al-Aali	0–3	Doo Hoi Kem	4–11, 5–11, 3–11

22 September	Uzbekistan	0–3	Hong Kong

Markhabo Magdieva	0–3	Lee Ho Ching	7–11, 3–11, 9–11
Rozalina Khadjieva	0–3	Zhu Chengzhu	6–11, 3–11, 3–11
Asel Erkebaeva	0–3	Doo Hoi Kem	3–11, 8–11, 5–11

23 September	Bahrain	0–3	Uzbekistan

Maryam Al-Aali	1–3	Rozalina Khadjieva	11–9, 5–11, 8–11, 5–11
Amruta Phadke	0–3	Markhabo Magdieva	4–11, 1–11, 2–11
Fatima Al-Aali	0–3	Asel Erkebaeva	5–11, 9–11, 6–11

==== Group F ====
Pos	Team	Pld	W	L	MF	MA	Pts	Qualification
1	India	2	2	0	6	2	4	Round of 16
2	Singapore	2	1	1	5	3	3	Round of 16
3	Nepal	2	0	2	0	6	2	

Source: Official website

22 September	Nepal	0–3	Singapore

Nabita Shrestha	0–3	Zhou Jingyi	4–11, 3–11, 4–11
Sikka Suwal Shrestha	0–3	Zeng Jian	2–11, 1–11, 4–11
Evana Thapa Magar	0–3	Wong Xin Ru	3–11, 7–11, 4–11

22 September	Singapore	2–3	India

Zeng Jian	3–1	Ayhika Mukherjee	7–11, 11–2, 11–7, 12–10
Zhou Jingyi	1–3	Manika Batra	9–11, 11–9, 7–11, 3–11
Wong Xin Ru	2–3	Sreeja Akula	14–12, 9–11, 11–8, 9–11, 7–11
Zeng Jian	3–2	Manika Batra	11–3, 3–11, 12–10, 10–12, 12–10
Zhou Jingyi	1–3	Ayhika Mukherjee	7–11, 8–11, 11–9, 5–11

23 September	India	3–0	Nepal

Diya Chitale	3–0	Sikka Suwal Shrestha	11–1, 11–6, 11–8
Ayhika Mukherjee	3–0	Nabita Shrestha	11–3, 11–7, 11–2
Sutirtha Mukherjee	3–0	Evana Thapa Magar	11–1, 11–5, 11–2

=== Knockout round ===
Round of 16
Vietnam	3
Uzbekistan	0
F1	India	2
Thailand	3
Kazakhstan	0
E1	Hong Kong	3
Singapore	0
Chinese Taipei	3

Quarterfinals
A1	China	3
Vietnam	0
Thailand	3
C1	North Korea	2
D1	South Korea	3
E1	Hong Kong	1
Chinese Taipei	0
B1	Japan	3

Semifinals
A1	China	3
Thailand	0
D1	South Korea	1
B1	Japan	3

Final
A1	China	3
B1	Japan	0

==== Round of 16 ====
24 September	Uzbekistan	0–3	Vietnam

Markhabo Magdieva	2–3	Trần Mai Ngọc	12–10, 7–11, 10–12, 12–10, 8–11
Rozalina Khadjieva	0–3	Nguyễn Khoa Diệu Khánh	8–11, 6–11, 7–11
Asel Erkebaeva	0–3	Bùi Ngọc Lan	9–11, 9–11, 7–11

24 September	Thailand	3–2	India

Orawan Paranang	3–0	Manika Batra	11–7, 11–1, 13–11
Suthasini Sawettabut	1–3	Ayhika Mukherjee	16–18, 7–11, 15–13, 9–11
Tamolwan Khetkhuan	2–3	Sutirtha Mukherjee	1–11, 11–9, 11–3, 7–11, 7–11
Orawan Paranang	3–2	Ayhika Mukherjee	10–12, 11–4, 5–11, 11–4, 11–3
Suthasini Sawettabut	3–1	Manika Batra	10–12, 11–8, 11–7, 11–6

24 September	Kazakhstan	0–3	Hong Kong

Zauresh Akasheva	1–3	Lee Ho Ching	11–7, 4–11, 9–11, 6–11
Sarvinoz Mirkadirova	0–3	Zhu Chengzhu	5–11, 3–11, 9–11
Anastassiya Lavrova	0–3	Doo Hoi Kem	5–11, 9–11, 7–11

24 September	Singapore	0–3	Chinese Taipei

Zeng Jian	1–3	Cheng I-ching	9–11, 9–11, 13–11, 11–13
Wong Xin Ru	0–3	Chen Szu-yu	3–11, 7–11, 4–11
Zhou Jingyi	2–3	Li Yu-jhun	14–12, 8–11, 12–14, 11–5, 4–11

==== Quarterfinals ====
24 September	Vietnam	0–3	China

Nguyễn Khoa Diệu Khánh	0–3	Chen Meng	0–11, 3–11, 4–11
Trần Mai Ngọc	0–3	Sun Yingsha	4–11, 1–11, 5–11
Bùi Ngọc Lan	0–3	Wang Manyu	6–11, 3–11, 1–11

24 September	Thailand	3–2	North Korea

Orawan Paranang	3–1	Cha Su-yong	12–14, 11–8, 12–10, 11–3
Suthasini Sawettabut	1–3	Pyon Song-gyong	9–11, 11–9, 6–11, 8–11
Jinnipa Sawettabut	0–3	Kim Kum-yong	7–11, 7–11, 5–11
Orawan Paranang	3–1	Pyon Song-gyong	11–9, 11–8, 12–14, 12–10
Suthasini Sawettabut	3–2	Cha Su-yong	11–6, 10–12, 11–0, 9–11, 11–7

24 September	South Korea	3–1	Hong Kong

Shin Yu-bin	1–3	Doo Hoi Kem	9–11, 12–10, 8–11, 7–11
Jeon Ji-hee	3–1	Zhu Chengzhu	8–11, 11–9, 11–7, 13–11
Suh Hyo-won	3–2	Lee Ho Ching	6–11, 11–6, 11–6, 4–11, 11–8
Shin Yu-bin	3–0	Zhu Chengzhu	11–7, 11–7, 11–6

24 September	Japan	3–0	Chinese Taipei

Hina Hayata	3–0	Li Yu-jhun	11–4, 11–1, 11–9
Miu Hirano	3–0	Liu Hsing-yin	11–4, 11–4, 11–6
Miwa Harimoto	3–1	Chen Szu-yu	11–8, 9–11, 11–4, 11–6

==== Semifinals ====
25 September	China	3–0	Thailand

Sun Yingsha	3–0	Suthasini Sawettabut	11–5, 11–6, 11–9
Wang Manyu	3–0	Orawan Paranang	11–2, 11–2, 11–7
Chen Meng	3–0	Tamolwan Khetkhuan	11–4, 11–7, 11–0

25 September	South Korea	1–3	Japan

Shin Yu-bin	0–3	Hina Hayata	7–11, 6–11, 8–11
Jeon Ji-hee	3–2	Miu Hirano	3–11, 14–12, 11–9, 4–11, 11–6
Suh Hyo-won	0–3	Miwa Harimoto	6–11, 10–12, 5–11
Shin Yu-bin	1–3	Miu Hirano	11–13, 11–7, 10–12, 9–11

==== Final ====
26 September	Japan	0–3	China

Hina Hayata	1–3	Sun Yingsha	6–11, 10–12, 11–8, 9–11
Miu Hirano	2–3	Chen Meng	10–12, 11–8, 11–7, 8–11, 5–11
Miwa Harimoto	1–3	Wang Manyu	11–6, 4–11, 7–11, 11–13

== Non-participating athletes ==
- Rayan Emad Rashed (BRN)
- Lam Yee Lok (HKG)
- Li Ching Wan (HKG)
- Lee Eun-hye (KOR)
- Yang Ha-eun (KOR)
- Lei Man In (MAC)
- Fathimath Dheema Ali (MDV)
- Bat-Erdeniin Egshiglen (MGL)
- Goi Rui Xuan (SGP)
- Ser Lin Qian (SGP)
- Huang Yi-hua (TPE)
- Nguyễn Thị Nga (VIE)
- Nguyễn Thùy Kiều My (VIE)
