= 2019 South East Asian Junior and Cadet Table Tennis Championships =

Sports competition

Tournament details
- Dates: 4–9 June 2019
- Edition: 25th
- Venue: Island Hall, Fashion Island
- Location: Bangkok, Thailand

The M-Electrolyte 25th South East Asian Junior and Cadet Table Tennis Championships 2019 were held in Bangkok, Thailand, from 4 to 9 June 2019.

== Medal summary ==
=== Events ===
Event	Gold	Silver	Bronze
Junior Boys' singles	Thailand; Wattanachai Samranvong	Singapore; Pang Yew En Koen	Thailand; Yanapong Panagitgun
Junior Boys' singles	Thailand; Wattanachai Samranvong	Singapore; Pang Yew En Koen	Singapore; Koh Song Jun Dominic
Junior Girls' singles	Malaysia; Karen Lyne Anak Dick	Singapore; Goi Rui Xuan	Malaysia; Tee Ai Xin
Junior Girls' singles	Malaysia; Karen Lyne Anak Dick	Singapore; Goi Rui Xuan	Singapore; Wong Xin Ru
Junior Boys' doubles	Singapore; Pang Yew En Koen; Chua Shao Han Josh	Thailand; Yanapong Panagitgun; Veerapat Puthikungasem	Malaysia; Ling Yi Heng Amos; Danny Ng Wann Sing
Junior Boys' doubles	Singapore; Pang Yew En Koen; Chua Shao Han Josh	Thailand; Yanapong Panagitgun; Veerapat Puthikungasem	Singapore; Beh Kun Ting; Koh Song Jun Dominic
Junior Girls' doubles	Malaysia; Karen Lyne Anak Dick; Tee Ai Xin	Singapore; Goi Rui Xuan; Wong Xin Ru	Singapore; Koh Kai Xin Pearlyn; Tan Li Lin Jassy
Junior Girls' doubles	Malaysia; Karen Lyne Anak Dick; Tee Ai Xin	Singapore; Goi Rui Xuan; Wong Xin Ru	Thailand; Pornkanok Muangwhan; Papatchaya Hoarakkit
Junior Mixed doubles	Singapore; Pang Yew En Koen; Goi Rui Xuan	Thailand; Yanapong Panagitgun; Thapanee Pormma	Singapore; Chua Shao Han Josh; Koh Kai Xin Pearlyn
Junior Mixed doubles	Singapore; Pang Yew En Koen; Goi Rui Xuan	Thailand; Yanapong Panagitgun; Thapanee Pormma	Singapore; Koh Song Jun Dominic; Wong Xin Ru
Junior Boys' team	Singapore; Pang Yew En Koen; Koh Song Jun Dominic; Chua Shao Han Josh; Beh Kun Ting	Thailand; Yanapong Panagitgun; Wattanachai Samranvong; Veerapat Puthikungasem; Thyme Sanglertsilpachai	Malaysia; Choong Javen; Ling Yi Heng Amos; Wong Qi Shen; Danny Ng Wann Sing
Junior Boys' team	Singapore; Pang Yew En Koen; Koh Song Jun Dominic; Chua Shao Han Josh; Beh Kun Ting	Thailand; Yanapong Panagitgun; Wattanachai Samranvong; Veerapat Puthikungasem; Thyme Sanglertsilpachai	Myanmar; Oo Soe Min; Oo Than Tun; Swan Pyae Tun
Junior Girls' team	Singapore; Goi Rui Xuan; Wong Xin Ru; Koh Kai Xin Pearlyn; Tan Li Lin Jassy	Malaysia; Karen Lyne Anak Dick; Tee Ai Xin; Zoe Fong Yi Chong; Lim Li Ying	Thailand; Thapanee Pormma; Pakawan Karnthang; Pornkanok Muangwhan; Papatchaya Hoarakkit
Junior Girls' team	Singapore; Goi Rui Xuan; Wong Xin Ru; Koh Kai Xin Pearlyn; Tan Li Lin Jassy	Malaysia; Karen Lyne Anak Dick; Tee Ai Xin; Zoe Fong Yi Chong; Lim Li Ying	Vietnam; Bui Ngoc Lan; Tran Minh Anh; Nguyen Thi Xuan Mai; Duong Thi Quynh Nhu
Cadet Boys' singles	Singapore; Izaac Quek Yong	Singapore; Daniel Ng	Malaysia; Tan Yi Heng
Cadet Boys' singles	Singapore; Izaac Quek Yong	Singapore; Daniel Ng	Thailand; Sitisak Nuchchart
Cadet Girls' singles	Singapore; Zhou Jingyi	Singapore; Ser Lin Qian	Philippines; Kheith Rhynne Cruz
Cadet Girls' singles	Singapore; Zhou Jingyi	Singapore; Ser Lin Qian	Singapore; Tan Zhao Yun
Cadet Boys' doubles	Singapore; Izaac Quek Yong; Daniel Ng	Malaysia; Tan Yi Heng; Lee Yong Yi	Thailand; Sitisak Nuchchart; Napat Thanmathikom
Cadet Boys' doubles	Singapore; Izaac Quek Yong; Daniel Ng	Malaysia; Tan Yi Heng; Lee Yong Yi	Vietnam; Liong Huu Duy; Nguyen Duy Phong
Cadet Girls' doubles	Thailand; Wanwisa Aueawiriyayothin; Phantita Pinyopisan	Vietnam; Nguyen Thi Mai Phuong; Tran Mai Ngoc	Singapore; Zhou Jingyi; Ser Lin Qian
Cadet Girls' doubles	Thailand; Wanwisa Aueawiriyayothin; Phantita Pinyopisan	Vietnam; Nguyen Thi Mai Phuong; Tran Mai Ngoc	Thailand; Piyapath Pilaisaengsuree; Nattaya Wantaneeyakul
Cadet Boys' team	Singapore; Izaac Quek Yong; Daniel Ng; Jong Yik Kiat	Malaysia; Tan Yi Heng; Lee Yong Yi; Muhammad Fazari Bin Juhari	Thailand; Puripong Saelee; Sitisak Nuchchart; Paramee Hyumthaisong
Cadet Boys' team	Singapore; Izaac Quek Yong; Daniel Ng; Jong Yik Kiat	Malaysia; Tan Yi Heng; Lee Yong Yi; Muhammad Fazari Bin Juhari	Vietnam; Nguyen Duy Phong; Liong Huu Duy; Bui Huu Huy
Cadet Girls' team	Singapore; Zhou Jingyi; Ser Lin Qian; Tan Zhao Yun	Thailand; Wanwisa Aueawiriyayothin; Phantita Pinyopisan; Piyapath Pilaisaengsuree	Malaysia; Annie Kong Siaw Mei; Lee Peng Look; Leow Yi Wenn
Cadet Girls' team	Singapore; Zhou Jingyi; Ser Lin Qian; Tan Zhao Yun	Thailand; Wanwisa Aueawiriyayothin; Phantita Pinyopisan; Piyapath Pilaisaengsuree	Vietnam; Tran Mai Ngoc; Lam Thu Cuc; Nguyen Thi Mai Phuong

=== Medal table ===
* Host nation (Thailand)

Rank	Nation	Gold	Silver	Bronze	Total
1	Singapore	9	5	8	22
2	Thailand*	2	4	7	13
3	Malaysia	2	3	5	10
4	Vietnam	0	1	4	5
5	Myanmar	0	0	1	1
5	Philippines	0	0	1	1
Totals (6 entries)		13	13	26	52

== See also ==
- 2019 World Junior Table Tennis Championships
- 2019 Asian Junior and Cadet Table Tennis Championships
- Asian Table Tennis Union
