= 2015 South East Asian Junior and Cadet Table Tennis Championships =

Tournament details
- Dates: 17 – 21 June 2015
- Edition: 21st
- Venue: National Sports Council Bukit Jalil
- Location: Kuala Lumpur, Malaysia

The 21st South East Asian Junior and Cadet Table Tennis Championships 2015 were held in Kuala Lumpur, Malaysia.

== Medal summary ==
=== Events ===
Event	Gold	Silver	Bronze
Junior Boys' singles	Thailand; Sirawit Puangthip	Singapore; Yin Jing Yuan	Singapore; Lim Zheng Jie Edric
Junior Boys' singles	Thailand; Sirawit Puangthip	Singapore; Yin Jing Yuan	Thailand; Naphat Panitcharoen
Junior Girls' singles	Thailand; Tamolwan Khetkhuan	Thailand; Orawan Paranang	Singapore; Yee Hering Hwee
Junior Girls' singles	Thailand; Tamolwan Khetkhuan	Thailand; Orawan Paranang	Singapore; Ang Wan Qi
Junior Boys' doubles	Thailand; Sirawit Puangthip; Pattaratorn Passara	Singapore; Yin Jing Yuan; Ethan Poh Shao Feng	Vietnam; Nguyen Duc Tuan; Le Van Duc
Junior Boys' doubles	Thailand; Sirawit Puangthip; Pattaratorn Passara	Singapore; Yin Jing Yuan; Ethan Poh Shao Feng	Vietnam; Nguyen Van Huan; Dang Tran Son
Junior Girls' doubles	Thailand; Tamolwan Khetkhuan; Orawan Paranang	Vietnam; Pham Thi Thu Huong; Vu Thi Thu Ha	Singapore; Yee Hering Hwee; Ang Wan Qi
Junior Girls' doubles	Thailand; Tamolwan Khetkhuan; Orawan Paranang	Vietnam; Pham Thi Thu Huong; Vu Thi Thu Ha	Singapore; Lim Eunice; Tan En Hui
Junior Mixed doubles	Thailand; Pattaratorn Passara; Tamolwan Khetkhuan	Thailand; Sirawit Puangthip; Orawan Paranang	Philippines; Philippines
Junior Mixed doubles	Thailand; Pattaratorn Passara; Tamolwan Khetkhuan	Thailand; Sirawit Puangthip; Orawan Paranang	Singapore; Yin Jing Yuan; Ang Wan Qi
Junior Boys' team	Thailand	Singapore; Yin Jing Yuan; Edric Lim; Maxxe Tay; Ethan Poh Shao Feng	Malaysia
Junior Boys' team	Thailand	Singapore; Yin Jing Yuan; Edric Lim; Maxxe Tay; Ethan Poh Shao Feng	Vietnam
Junior Girls' team	Thailand	Singapore; Yee Hering Hwee; Lim Eunice; Tan En Hui; Ang Wan Qi	Malaysia
Junior Girls' team	Thailand	Singapore; Yee Hering Hwee; Lim Eunice; Tan En Hui; Ang Wan Qi	Vietnam
Cadet Boys' singles	Thailand; Yannapong Panagitgun	Thailand; Varote Shotelersuk	Malaysia; Javen Choong
Cadet Boys' singles	Thailand; Yannapong Panagitgun	Thailand; Varote Shotelersuk	Singapore; Gerald Yu Zong Jun
Cadet Girls' singles	Singapore; Nicole Lew Zermaine	Thailand; Jinnipa Sawettabut	Singapore; Zhang Wanling
Cadet Girls' singles	Singapore; Nicole Lew Zermaine	Thailand; Jinnipa Sawettabut	Singapore; Tay Hui Wen
Cadet Boys' doubles	Malaysia; Javen Choong; Chin Wen Jie	Thailand; Yannapong Panagitgun; Varote Shotelersuk	Philippines; Jann Mari Nayre; Reynaldo Templado
Cadet Boys' doubles	Malaysia; Javen Choong; Chin Wen Jie	Thailand; Yannapong Panagitgun; Varote Shotelersuk	Singapore; Beh Kun Ting; Gerald Yu Zong Jun
Cadet Girls' doubles	Thailand; Jinnipa Sawettabut; Monapsorn Saritapirak	Singapore; Zhang Wanling; Nicole Lew Zermaine	Philippines; Jannah Maryam Romero; Alexandra Reyes
Cadet Girls' doubles	Thailand; Jinnipa Sawettabut; Monapsorn Saritapirak	Singapore; Zhang Wanling; Nicole Lew Zermaine	Malaysia; Alice Li Sian Chang; Tey Ka Ying
Cadet Boys' team	Thailand	Malaysia	Philippines
Cadet Boys' team	Thailand	Malaysia	Singapore; Beh Kun Ting; Gerald Yu Zong Jun; Chia Shing Kee
Cadet Girls' team	Thailand	Singapore; Tay Hui Wen; Nicole Lew Zermaine; Zhang Wanling	Malaysia
Cadet Girls' team	Thailand	Singapore; Tay Hui Wen; Nicole Lew Zermaine; Zhang Wanling	Vietnam

=== Medal table ===
* Host nation (Malaysia)

Rank	Nation	Gold	Silver	Bronze	Total
1	Thailand	11	5	1	17
2	Singapore	1	6	11	18
3	Malaysia	1	1	5	7
4	Vietnam	0	1	5	6
5	Philippines	0	0	4	4
Totals (5 entries)		13	13	26	52

== See also ==
- 2015 World Junior Table Tennis Championships
- 2015 Asian Junior and Cadet Table Tennis Championships
- Asian Table Tennis Union
