= 2016 South East Asian Junior and Cadet Table Tennis Championships =

Tournament details
- Dates: 9–12 July 2016
- Edition: 22nd
- Location: Phnom Penh, Cambodia

The 22nd South East Asian Junior and Cadet Table Tennis Championships 2016 were held in Phnom Penh, Cambodia.

== Medal summary ==
=== Events ===
Event	Gold	Silver	Bronze
Junior Boys' singles	Singapore; Ethan Poh Shao Feng	Singapore; Lucas Tan	[[]]
Junior Boys' singles	Singapore; Ethan Poh Shao Feng	Singapore; Lucas Tan	Vietnam; Vu Quang Hien
Junior Girls' singles	Thailand; Monapsorn Salidapiluk	Singapore; Nicole Lew Zermaine	Singapore; Ang Wan Qi
Junior Girls' singles	Thailand; Monapsorn Salidapiluk	Singapore; Nicole Lew Zermaine	[[]]
Junior Boys' doubles	Singapore; Lucas Tan; Maxxe Tay	Vietnam	Singapore; Ethan Poh Shao Feng; Darren Loy
Junior Boys' doubles	Singapore; Lucas Tan; Maxxe Tay	Vietnam	Vietnam
Junior Girls' doubles	Singapore; Zhang Wanling; Tan En Hui	Singapore; Ang Wan Qi; Nicole Lew Zermaine	Thailand
Junior Girls' doubles	Singapore; Zhang Wanling; Tan En Hui	Singapore; Ang Wan Qi; Nicole Lew Zermaine	Thailand
Junior Mixed doubles	Singapore; Maxxe Tay; Tan En Hui	Vietnam	Singapore; Ethan Poh Shao Feng; Nicole Lew Zermaine
Junior Mixed doubles	Singapore; Maxxe Tay; Tan En Hui	Vietnam	Singapore; Lucas Tan; Zhang Wanling
Junior Boys' team	Singapore; Ethan Poh Shao Feng; Maxxe Tay; Darren Loy; Lucas Tan	[[]]	[[]]
Junior Boys' team	Singapore; Ethan Poh Shao Feng; Maxxe Tay; Darren Loy; Lucas Tan	[[]]	[[]]
Junior Girls' team	Singapore; Ang Wan Qi; Tan En Hui; Zhang Wanling; Nicole Lew Zermaine	[[]]	[[]]
Junior Girls' team	Singapore; Ang Wan Qi; Tan En Hui; Zhang Wanling; Nicole Lew Zermaine	[[]]	[[]]
Cadet Boys' singles	Singapore; Beh Kun Ting	Singapore; Gerald Yu Zong Jun	Thailand
Cadet Boys' singles	Singapore; Beh Kun Ting	Singapore; Gerald Yu Zong Jun	Singapore; Pang Yew En Koen
Cadet Girls' singles	Singapore; Goi Rui Xuan	Singapore; Wong Xinru	Thailand
Cadet Girls' singles	Singapore; Goi Rui Xuan	Singapore; Wong Xinru	Singapore; Pearlyn Koh Kai Xin
Cadet Boys' doubles	Singapore; Beh Kun Ting; Pang Yew En Koen	Malaysia	Philippines
Cadet Boys' doubles	Singapore; Beh Kun Ting; Pang Yew En Koen	Malaysia	Thailand
Cadet Girls' doubles	[[]]	Singapore; Goi Rui Xuan; Pearlyn Koh Kai Xin	Thailand; Thanathnan Choosattayanond; Phantita Pinyopisan
Cadet Girls' doubles	[[]]	Singapore; Goi Rui Xuan; Pearlyn Koh Kai Xin	[[]]
Cadet Boys' team	Singapore; Beh Kun Ting; Gerald Yu Zong Jun; Pang Yew En Koen	[[]]	[[]]
Cadet Boys' team	Singapore; Beh Kun Ting; Gerald Yu Zong Jun; Pang Yew En Koen	[[]]	[[]]
Cadet Girls' team	Singapore; Goi Rui Xuan; Pearlyn Koh Kai Xin; Wong Xinru	Vietnam	Malaysia
Cadet Girls' team	Singapore; Goi Rui Xuan; Pearlyn Koh Kai Xin; Wong Xinru	Vietnam	Philippines

=== Medal table ===
Rank	Nation	Gold	Silver	Bronze	Total
1	Singapore	11	6	6	23
2	Vietnam	0	3	2	5
3	Malaysia	0	1	1	2
4	Thailand	0	0	5	5
5	Philippines	0	0	2	2
Totals (5 entries)		11	10	16	37

== See also ==
- 2016 World Junior Table Tennis Championships
- 2016 Asian Junior and Cadet Table Tennis Championships
- Asian Table Tennis Union
