= 2013 South East Asian Junior and Cadet Table Tennis Championships =

Tournament details
- Dates: 12–16 July 2013
- Edition: 19th
- Venue: Garden Square, Harrison Plaza
- Location: Manila, Philippines

The 19th South East Asian Junior and Cadet Table Tennis Championships 2013 were held at the Garden Square of the Harrison Plaza in Manila, Philippines.

== Medal summary ==
=== Events ===
Event	Gold	Silver	Bronze
Junior Boys' singles	Singapore; Clarence Chew	Thailand; Padasak Tanviriyavechakul	Singapore; Yin Jing Yuan
Junior Boys' singles	Singapore; Clarence Chew	Thailand; Padasak Tanviriyavechakul	Vietnam
Junior Girls' singles	Singapore; Lin Ye	Thailand; Orawan Paranang	Thailand; Piyaporn Pannak
Junior Girls' singles	Singapore; Lin Ye	Thailand; Orawan Paranang	Thailand; Thamonwan Khet Dam
Junior Boys' doubles	Singapore; Clarence Chew; Kerry Tan	Vietnam; Tran Hoai Nam; Le Tuan Anh	Thailand; Padasak Tanviriyavechakul; Suphanat Wisutmethangkun
Junior Boys' doubles	Singapore; Clarence Chew; Kerry Tan	Vietnam; Tran Hoai Nam; Le Tuan Anh	Vietnam
Junior Girls' doubles	Singapore; Lin Ye; Yee Herng Hwee	Malaysia; Ho Ying; Lee Rou You	Singapore; Cheryl Tang; Lim Yixuan
Junior Girls' doubles	Singapore; Lin Ye; Yee Herng Hwee	Malaysia; Ho Ying; Lee Rou You	Thailand; Tamolwan Khetkhuan; Orawan Paranang
Junior Mixed doubles	Singapore; Clarence Chew; Lin Ye	Singapore; Kerry Tan; Yee Herng Hwee	Singapore; Tay Jit Kiat; Ang Wan Qi
Junior Mixed doubles	Singapore; Clarence Chew; Lin Ye	Singapore; Kerry Tan; Yee Herng Hwee	Thailand; Padasak Tanviriyavechakul; Piyaporn Pannak
Junior Boys' team	Thailand	Singapore	Malaysia
Junior Boys' team	Thailand	Singapore	Vietnam
Junior Girls' team	Singapore	Thailand	Malaysia
Junior Girls' team	Singapore	Thailand	Vietnam
Cadet Boys' singles	Malaysia; Leong Chee Feng	Thailand; Sirawit Puangthip	Philippines; Jann Mari Nayre
Cadet Boys' singles	Malaysia; Leong Chee Feng	Thailand; Sirawit Puangthip	Singapore; Loy Meng Hean Darren
Cadet Girls' singles	Singapore; Ang Wan Qi	Thailand; Monapsorn Saritapirak	Malaysia; Amanda Wong
Cadet Girls' singles	Singapore; Ang Wan Qi	Thailand; Monapsorn Saritapirak	Malaysia; Angeline Tang
Cadet Boys' doubles	Thailand; Sirawit Puangthip; Chaiyadej Moungwhan	Singapore; Loy Meng Hean Darren; Tay Ming Han Maxxe	Malaysia; Leong Chee Feng; Chua Zhong Ling
Cadet Boys' doubles	Thailand; Sirawit Puangthip; Chaiyadej Moungwhan	Singapore; Loy Meng Hean Darren; Tay Ming Han Maxxe	Vietnam; Ngunen Anh Duc; Nguyen Trung Kien
Cadet Girls' doubles	Malaysia; Angeline Tang; Amanda Wong	Vietnam; Vu Thi Thu Ha; Mai Tu Uyen	Philippines; Emy Rose Dael; Ann Gella Borbon
Cadet Girls' doubles	Malaysia; Angeline Tang; Amanda Wong	Vietnam; Vu Thi Thu Ha; Mai Tu Uyen	Singapore; Ang Wan Qi; Wong Yan Lin Gladys
Cadet Boys' team	Thailand	Singapore	Philippines
Cadet Boys' team	Thailand	Singapore	Vietnam
Cadet Girls' team	Singapore	Malaysia	Thailand
Cadet Girls' team	Singapore	Malaysia	Vietnam

=== Medal table ===
* Host nation (Philippines)

Rank	Nation	Gold	Silver	Bronze	Total
1	Singapore	8	4	5	17
2	Thailand	3	5	6	14
3	Malaysia	2	2	5	9
4	Vietnam	0	2	7	9
5	Philippines*	0	0	3	3
Totals (5 entries)		13	13	26	52

== See also ==
- 2013 World Junior Table Tennis Championships
- 2013 Asian Junior and Cadet Table Tennis Championships
- Asian Table Tennis Union
