= 2014 South East Asian Junior and Cadet Table Tennis Championships =

Tournament details
- Dates: 16–21 June 2014
- Edition: 20th
- Venue: The Indoor Stadium, Barakas
- Location: Bandar Seri Begawan, Brunei

The 20th South East Asian Junior and Cadet Table Tennis Championships 2014 were held in Bandar Seri Begawan, Brunei.

== Medal summary ==
=== Events ===
Event	Gold	Silver	Bronze
Junior Boys' singles	Thailand; Nitipat Pimrat	Thailand; Komgrit Sangpao	Malaysia; Mohamad Hashri Fikri
Junior Boys' singles	Thailand; Nitipat Pimrat	Thailand; Komgrit Sangpao	Thailand; Supanat Wisutmaythangkoon
Junior Girls' singles	Singapore; Lin Ye	Thailand; Orawan Paranang	Singapore; Yee Herng Hwee
Junior Girls' singles	Singapore; Lin Ye	Thailand; Orawan Paranang	Singapore; Ang Wan Qi
Junior Boys' doubles	Malaysia; Mohamad Hashri Fikri; Wong Chun Cheun	Vietnam; Bui Trung Kien; Nguyen Duc Tuan	Singapore; Edric Lim Zheng Jie; Kyros Koh Yik Kiat
Junior Boys' doubles	Malaysia; Mohamad Hashri Fikri; Wong Chun Cheun	Vietnam; Bui Trung Kien; Nguyen Duc Tuan	Thailand; Nitipat Pimrat; Komgrit Sangpao
Junior Girls' doubles	Thailand; Orawan Paranang; Apichaya Sritavarit	Singapore; Lin Ye; Yee Herng Hwee	Singapore; Ang Wan Qi; Tay Hui Li
Junior Girls' doubles	Thailand; Orawan Paranang; Apichaya Sritavarit	Singapore; Lin Ye; Yee Herng Hwee	Vietnam; Nguyen Ngoc Yen Nhi; Pham Thi Thu Huong
Junior Mixed doubles	Thailand; Supanat Wisutmaythangkoon; Orawan Paranang	Singapore; Edric Lim Zheng Jie; Lin Ye	Singapore; Darren Luy; Ang Wan Qi
Junior Mixed doubles	Thailand; Supanat Wisutmaythangkoon; Orawan Paranang	Singapore; Edric Lim Zheng Jie; Lin Ye	Thailand; Kotcharuk Sookpraserd; Jarinya Pramuansin
Junior Boys' team	Thailand	Singapore	Vietnam
Junior Boys' team	Thailand	Singapore	Indonesia
Junior Girls' team	Singapore	Thailand	Vietnam
Junior Girls' team	Singapore	Thailand	Indonesia
Cadet Boys' singles	Singapore; Lucas Tan	Thailand; Yanapong Panagitgun	Philippines; Jann Mari Nayre
Cadet Boys' singles	Singapore; Lucas Tan	Thailand; Yanapong Panagitgun	Thailand; Pattaratorn Passara
Cadet Girls' singles	Thailand; Cathareeya Poungsri	Thailand; Monapsorn Saritapirak	Indonesia; Rina Sintya
Cadet Girls' singles	Thailand; Cathareeya Poungsri	Thailand; Monapsorn Saritapirak	Indonesia; Desi Ramandanti
Cadet Boys' doubles	Thailand; Pattaratorn Passara; Yanapong Panagitgun	Indonesia; Rahmat N Pakaya; Marcello	Singapore; Ethan Poh Shao Feng; Lucas Tan
Cadet Boys' doubles	Thailand; Pattaratorn Passara; Yanapong Panagitgun	Indonesia; Rahmat N Pakaya; Marcello	Vietnam; Nguyen Ang Duc; Vo Huu Quoc
Cadet Girls' doubles	Thailand; Cathareeya Poungsri; Monapsorn Saritapirak	Indonesia; Rina Sintya; Desi Ramandanti	Philippines; Ma. Angelica Sanchez; Jannah Maryam Romero
Cadet Girls' doubles	Thailand; Cathareeya Poungsri; Monapsorn Saritapirak	Indonesia; Rina Sintya; Desi Ramandanti	Singapore; Linda Zeng Ziyue; Zhang Wanling
Cadet Boys' team	Singapore	Thailand	Indonesia
Cadet Boys' team	Singapore	Thailand	Vietnam
Cadet Girls' team	Indonesia	Thailand	Malaysia
Cadet Girls' team	Indonesia	Thailand	Vietnam

=== Medal table ===
Rank	Nation	Gold	Silver	Bronze	Total
1	Thailand	7	7	4	18
2	Singapore	4	3	7	14
3	Indonesia	1	2	5	8
4	Malaysia	1	0	2	3
5	Vietnam	0	1	6	7
6	Philippines	0	0	2	2
Totals (6 entries)		13	13	26	52

== See also ==
- 2014 World Junior Table Tennis Championships
- 2014 Asian Junior and Cadet Table Tennis Championships
- Asian Table Tennis Union
