= South East Asian Junior and Cadet Table Tennis Championships =

Tournament information
- Sport: Table tennis
- Location: South East Asia
- Established: 1993
- Administrator: SEATTA, ATTU, & ITTF
- Tournament format(s): Singles: Groups/Knockout; Doubles: Knockout; Team: Groups/Knockout

The South East Asian Junior and Cadet Table Tennis Championships is an annual table tennis tournament regarded as a regional championships between juniors and cadets. It will be held under the management of the South East Asian Table Tennis Association (SEATTA). The winner(s) and runner-up(s) of the Juniors and Cadets will qualify for the Asian Junior and Cadet Table Tennis Championships (AJCTTC).

== Editions ==
=== Championships ===
Edition	Year	Host city	Events (J+C)
1	1993	Kuala Lumpur, Malaysia	
2	1994	Manila, Philippines	
3	1995	Singapore, Singapore	
4	1996	Kuala Lumpur, Malaysia	
5	1997	Jakarta, Indonesia	
6	1999	Bangkok, Thailand	
7	2001	Ipoh, Malaysia	
8	2002	Singapore, Singapore	
9	2003	Manila, Philippines	
10	2004	Jakarta, Indonesia	
11	2005	Bandar Seri Begawan, Brunei	
12	2006	Bangkok, Thailand	
13	2007	Vientiane, Laos	
14	2008	Kuala Lumpur, Malaysia	
15	2009	Bangkok, Thailand	
16	2010	Phnom Penh, Cambodia	7+4
17	2011	Hải Dương, Vietnam	
18	2012	Yogyakarta, Indonesia	
19	2013	Manila, Philippines	7+6
20	2014	Bandar Seri Begawan, Brunei	7+6
21	2015	Kuala Lumpur, Malaysia	7+6
22	2016	Phnom Penh, Cambodia	7+6
23	2017	Singapore, Singapore	7+6
24	2018	Naga, Philippines	7+6
25	2019	Bangkok, Thailand	7+6
26	2022	Bangkok, Thailand	7+6

== Results of individual and team events ==
=== Medal table (2010–present) ===
Rank	Nation	Gold	Silver	Bronze	Total
1	Singapore	62	38	63	163
2	Thailand	37	40	49	126
3	Malaysia	11	16	37	64
4	Vietnam	2	11	39	52
5	Indonesia	1	5	13	19
6	Philippines	0	2	18	20
7	Myanmar	0	0	1	1
8	Brunei	0	0	0	0
8	Cambodia	0	0	0	0
8	Laos	0	0	0	0
Totals (10 entries)		113	112	220	445

- Some medals of 2011, 2012, and 2016 are unknown

== See also ==
- Asian Junior and Cadet Table Tennis Championships
- Asian Table Tennis Union
- List of table tennis players
- South East Asian Table Tennis Championships
- ITTF World Youth Championships
