= Table tennis at the 2019 SEA Games – Men's doubles =

Table tennis – Men's doubles at the 2019 SEA Games
- Venue: Subic Bay Exhibition & Convention Center
- Dates: 6–7 December 2019
- Competitors: 26 from 7 nations

Medalists
gold medal	Doan Ba Tuan Anh; Nguyen Anh Tu	Vietnam
silver medal	Josh Shao Han Chua; Pang Yew En Koen	Singapore
bronze medal	Javen Choong; Amos Ling Heng	Malaysia
bronze medal	Muhamad Ashraf Haiqal; Wong Qi Shen	Malaysia

The men's doubles competition of the table tennis events at the 2019 SEA Games was held from 6 to 7 December at the Subic Bay Exhibition & Convention Center in Subic Bay Freeport Zone, Zambales, Philippines.

== Schedule ==
All times are Philippines Time (UTC+08:00).

Date	Time	Round
6 December 2019	10:00	Round of 16
6 December 2019	16:00	Quarterfinals
7 December 2019	10:40	Semifinals
7 December 2019	14:15	Finals

== Results ==
Source: Event Summary

Round of 16; 6 December 10:00
Chew Zhe Yu Clarence (SGP); Poh Shao Feng Ethan (SGP)
Bye
Myint Kyi (MYA); Oo Soe Min (MYA)	1
Javen Choong (MAS); Amos Ling Heng (MAS)	3
Passara Pattaratorn (THA); Panagitgun Yanapong (THA)	3
John Russel Misal (PHI); Jann Mari Nayre (PHI)	0
Lay Phakdey (CAM); Soeung Tola (CAM)	0
Doan Ba Tuan Anh (VIE); Nguyen Anh Tu (VIE)	3
Josh Shao Han Chua (SGP); Pang Yew En Koen (SGP)
Bye
Vu Quang Hien (VIE); Dinh Anh Hoang (VIE)	2
Japheth Adasa (PHI); Richard Pugoy Gonzales (PHI)	3
Muhamad Ashraf Haiqal (MAS); Wong Qi Shen (MAS)	3
Sarak Soupring (CAM); Bun Visal (CAM)	0
Bye
Padasak Tanviriyavechakul (THA); Wisutmaythangkoon Supanat (THA)

Quarterfinal; 6 December 16:00
Chew Zhe Yu Clarence (SGP); Poh Shao Feng Ethan (SGP)	2
Javen Choong (MAS); Amos Ling Heng (MAS)	3
Passara Pattaratorn (THA); Panagitgun Yanapong (THA)	2
Doan Ba Tuan Anh (VIE); Nguyen Anh Tu (VIE)	3
Josh Shao Han Chua (SGP); Pang Yew En Koen (SGP)	3
Japheth Adasa (SGP); Richard Pugoy Gonzales (PHI)	0
Muhamad Ashraf Haiqal (MAS); Wong Qi Shen (MAS)	3
Padasak Tanviriyavechakul (THA); Wisutmaythangkoon Supanat (THA)	2

Semifinal; 7 December 10:40
Javen Choong (MAS); Amos Ling Heng (MAS)	1
Doan Ba Tuan Anh (VIE); Nguyen Anh Tu (VIE)	3
Josh Shao Han Chua (SGP); Pang Yew En Koen (SGP)	3
Muhamad Ashraf Haiqal (MAS); Wong Qi Shen (MAS)	2

Gold medal match 7 December 14:15
Doan Ba Tuan Anh (VIE); Nguyen Anh Tu (VIE)	3
Josh Shao Han Chua (SGP); Pang Yew En Koen (SGP)	1
