= Table tennis at the 2021 SEA Games – Women's team =

Table tennis – Women's team at the 2021 SEA Games
- Venue: Hải Dương Gymnasium
- Dates: 13–15 May 2022
- Competitors: 20 from 6 nations

Medalists
gold medal	Thailand (THA)
silver medal	Singapore (SIN)
bronze medal	Malaysia (MAS)
bronze medal	Vietnam (VIE)

The Women's team competition of the table tennis event at the 2021 SEA Games will be held from 13 to 15 May at the Hải Dương Gymnasium in Hải Dương, Vietnam.

== Schedule ==
All times are Vietnam Time (UTC+07:00).

Date	Time	Round
Friday, 13 May 2022	10:00	Preliminaries
Saturday, 14 May 2022	10:00	Semifinals
Sunday, 15 May 2022	14:30	Finals

== Results ==
=== Preliminary round ===
Source: Results (Groups) - Women's Team

==== Group A ====
Team	Pld	W	L	MF	MA	GF	GA
Thailand (THA)	2	2	0	6	1	18	2
Vietnam (VIE)	2	1	1	3	3	10	10
Philippines (PHI)	2	0	2	1	6	2	18

13 May 2022; 10:00	Thailand	3–0	Philippines

Report	Individual matches
Suthasini Sawettabut	3–0	Kheith Rhynne Baldemoro Cruz	11 - 5, 11 - 4, 11 - 9
Orawan Paranang	3–1	Angelou Joyce Tamares Laude	11 - 3, 5 - 11, 11 - 6, 11 - 3
Jinnipa Sawettabut	3–0	Emy Rose Pescadero Dael	11 - 5, 14 - 12, 11 - 7

13 May 2022; 14:30	Thailand	3–0	Vietnam

Report	Individual matches
Orawan Paranang	3–0	Nguyễn Thị Nga
Suthasini Sawettabut	3–1	Nguyễn Khoa Diệu Khánh
Jinnipa Sawettabut	3–0	Bùi Ngọc Lan

13 May 2022; 19:32	Vietnam	3–0	Philippines

Report	Individual matches
Nguyễn Khoa Diệu Khánh	3–0	Angelou Joyce Tamares Laude	11 - 8, 11 - 4, 11 - 5
Nguyễn Thị Nga	3–1	Kheith Rhynne Baldemoro Cruz	8 - 11, 11 - 8, 11 - 7, 11 - 8
Bùi Ngọc Lan	3–0	Emy Rose Pescadero Dael

==== Group B ====
Team	Pld	W	L	MF	MA	GF	GA
Singapore (SIN)	2	2	0	6	1	19	5
Malaysia (MAS)	2	1	1	4	3	14	10
Cambodia (CAM)	2	0	2	0	6	0	18

13 May 2022; 10:00	Singapore	3–0	Cambodia

Report	Individual matches
Zeng Jian	3–0	Khiev Chendaroth
. Goi Rui Xuan	3–0	Yin Chanrotana
Wong Xin Ru	3–0	Bo Insou

13 May 2022; 14:30	Singapore	3–1	Malaysia

Report	Individual matches
Zeng Jian	3–0	Alice Chang Li Sian
Zhou Jingyi	3–2	Ho Ying
Goi Rui Xuan	1–3	Karen Lyne Anak Dick
Zeng Jian	3–0	Ho Ying

13 May 2022; 19:30	Malaysia	3–0	Cambodia

Report	Individual matches
Karen Lyne Anak Dick	3–0	Bo Insou
Alice Chang Li Sian	3–0	Yin Chanrotana
Tee Ai Xin	3–0	Khiev Chendaroth

=== Knockout round ===
Source: Results - Women's Team

Semifinals; 14 May 10:30
Thailand	3
Malaysia	0
Vietnam	1
Singapore	3

Gold medal match 15 May 14:30
Thailand	3
Singapore	0

==== Semifinals ====
14 May 2022; 10:00	Thailand	3–0	Malaysia

Report	Individual matches
Orawan Paranang	3–2	Ho Ying	4 - 11, 11 - 4, 9 - 11, 11 - 9, 11 - 5
Suthasini Sawettabut	3–0	Karen Lyne Anak Dick	11 - 6, 16 - 14, 11 - 6
Jinnipa Sawettabut	3–1	Alice Chang Li Sian	11 - 7, 11 - 6, 9 - 11, 11 - 6

14 May 2021; 10:00	Vietnam	1–3	Singapore

Report	Individual matches
Nguyễn Khoa Diệu Khánh	3–2	Wong Xin Ru	11 - 5, 10 - 12, 9 - 11, 11 - 4, 11 - 7
Nguyễn Thị Nga	1–3	Zeng Jian	5 - 11, 12 - 10, 3 - 11, 6 - 11
Bùi Ngọc Lan	0–3	Zhou Jingyi	9 - 11, 7 - 11, 7 - 11
Nguyễn Khoa Diệu Khánh	1–3	Zeng Jian	4 - 11, 4 - 11, 11 - 9, 8 - 11

==== Gold medal match ====
15 May 2021; 14:30	Thailand	3–0	Singapore

Report	Individual matches
Suthasini Sawettabut	3–0	Zhou Jingyi	11 - 7, 11 - 9, 11 - 7
Orawan Paranang	3–2	Zeng Jian	11 - 4, 9 - 11, 8 - 11, 11 - 8, 12 - 10
Jinnipa Sawettabut	3–1	Wong Xin Ru	11 - 6, 11 - 9, 8 - 11, 11 - 4
