= 2010 South East Asian Junior and Cadet Table Tennis Championships =

Tournament details
- Dates: 3–7 June 2010
- Edition: 16th
- Location: Phnom Penh, Cambodia

The 16th South East Asian Junior Table Tennis Championships 2010 were held in Phnom Penh, Cambodia.

== Medal summary ==
=== Events ===
| Event | Gold | Silver | Bronze |
|---|---|---|---|
| Junior Boys' singles (U-18) | Singapore; Pang Xue Jie | Vietnam; Nguyen Huu Duc | Thailand; Tanapol Santiwattanatarm |
| Junior Boys' singles (U-18) | Singapore; Pang Xue Jie | Vietnam; Nguyen Huu Duc | Thailand; Montryphat Nithibenyaphisamai |
| Junior Girls' singles (U-18) | Singapore; Li Siyun Isabelle | Thailand; Suthasini Sawettabut | Singapore; Kwa Hui Qi |
| Junior Girls' singles (U-18) | Singapore; Li Siyun Isabelle | Thailand; Suthasini Sawettabut | Thailand; Pisittha Makumporn |
| Junior Boys' doubles (U-18) | Singapore; Pang Xue Jie; Lim Jie Yang | Indonesia; Julius Dwi Cahyo Kusumo; Rocky Christofel Eman | Thailand; Peerapol Kunprasert; Tanapol Santiwattanatarm |
| Junior Boys' doubles (U-18) | Singapore; Pang Xue Jie; Lim Jie Yang | Indonesia; Julius Dwi Cahyo Kusumo; Rocky Christofel Eman | Vietnam; Nguyen Huu Duc; Ha Phuoc Thanh |
| Junior Girls' doubles (U-18) | Thailand; Suthasini Sawettabut; Areeya Sangpao | Singapore; Look Pei Yee Sylvia; Li Siyun Isablle | Singapore; Chau Hai Qing; Kwa Hui Qi |
| Junior Girls' doubles (U-18) | Thailand; Suthasini Sawettabut; Areeya Sangpao | Singapore; Look Pei Yee Sylvia; Li Siyun Isablle | Vietnam; Nguyen Thi veit Linh; Tran Thi Cam Tien |
| Junior Mixed doubles (U-18) | Singapore; Chew Zheyu Clarence; Li Siyun Isabelle | Singapore; Lim Jie Yang; Kwa Hui Qi | Indonesia; Rocky Christofel Eman; Stella Friska Palit |
| Junior Mixed doubles (U-18) | Singapore; Chew Zheyu Clarence; Li Siyun Isabelle | Singapore; Lim Jie Yang; Kwa Hui Qi | Thailand; Tanapol Santiwattanatarm; Suthasini Sawettabut |
| Junior Boys' team (U-18) | Vietnam; Nguyen Huu Duc; Le Tien dat Trinh Duc Luan; Ha Phuoc Thanh | Indonesia; Julius Dwi Cahyo Kusumo; Fa Hmi; Rocky Christofel Eman; Grlang Ramadhan | Singapore; Lim Jie Yang; Ban Ho Hian Dylan; Zhang Jun Ming; Pang Xue Jie; Chew Zheyu Clarence |
| Junior Boys' team (U-18) | Vietnam; Nguyen Huu Duc; Le Tien dat Trinh Duc Luan; Ha Phuoc Thanh | Indonesia; Julius Dwi Cahyo Kusumo; Fa Hmi; Rocky Christofel Eman; Grlang Ramadhan | Thailand; Rachalak Chanpong Sang; Padasak Tanviriyacechakul; Peerapol Kunprasert; Tanapol Santiwattanatarm; Montryphat Nithibenyaphisamai |
| Junior Girls' team (U-18) | Singapore; Look Pei Yee Sylvia; Li Siyun Isablle; Chau Hai Qing; Kwa Hui Qi | Thailand; Suthasini Sawettabut; Rattanaporn Rattanavongsa; Pisittha Makumporn; Tamolwan Khetkuen; Piya Porn Pannak | Malaysia; Sheryn Yong Shi Yee; Lim Ann Er; Lee Rou You; Ho Ying |
| Junior Girls' team (U-18) | Singapore; Look Pei Yee Sylvia; Li Siyun Isablle; Chau Hai Qing; Kwa Hui Qi | Thailand; Suthasini Sawettabut; Rattanaporn Rattanavongsa; Pisittha Makumporn; Tamolwan Khetkuen; Piya Porn Pannak | Vietnam; Nguyen Thi Viet Linh; Tran Thi Cam Tien; Nguyen Mai Huong; Nguyen Ngoc Thanh |
| Cadet Boys' singles (U-15) | Thailand; Padasak Tanviriyavechakul | Thailand; Suchat Pitakgulsiri | Singapore; Chew Zheyu Clarence |
| Cadet Boys' singles (U-15) | Thailand; Padasak Tanviriyavechakul | Thailand; Suchat Pitakgulsiri | Singapore; Tan Kiat Yi Kerry |
| Cadet Girls' singles (U-15) | Vietnam; Nguyen Hong Tam | Thailand; PiyaPorn Pannak | Indonesia; Mira Fitri |
| Cadet Girls' singles (U-15) | Vietnam; Nguyen Hong Tam | Thailand; PiyaPorn Pannak | Singapore; Lam Teng Si |
| Cadet Boys' doubles (U-15) | Singapore; Chew Zheyu Clarence; Tan Kiat Yi Kerry | Thailand; Suchat Pitakgulsiri; Padasak Tanviriyavechakul | Malaysia; Foo Dunley; Leong Jie Wei |
| Cadet Boys' doubles (U-15) | Singapore; Chew Zheyu Clarence; Tan Kiat Yi Kerry | Thailand; Suchat Pitakgulsiri; Padasak Tanviriyavechakul | Vietnam; Nguyen Thanh Nam; Doan Ba Tuan Anh |
| Cadet Girls' doubles (U-15) | Thailand; Tamolwan Khetkuen; Piyaporn Pannak | Malaysia; Lee Rou You; Lim Ja Ja | Indonesia; Mira Fitri; Kharisma |
| Cadet Girls' doubles (U-15) | Thailand; Tamolwan Khetkuen; Piyaporn Pannak | Malaysia; Lee Rou You; Lim Ja Ja | Singapore; Lam Teng Si; Wong Hoi Ching |

=== Medal table ===
| Rank | Nation | Gold | Silver | Bronze | Total |
|---|---|---|---|---|---|
| 1 | Singapore | 6 | 2 | 7 | 15 |
| 2 | Thailand | 3 | 5 | 6 | 14 |
| 3 | Vietnam | 2 | 1 | 4 | 7 |
| 4 | Indonesia | 0 | 2 | 3 | 5 |
| 5 | Malaysia | 0 | 1 | 2 | 3 |
| Totals (5 entries) | | 11 | 11 | 22 | 44 |

== See also ==
- 2010 World Junior Table Tennis Championships
- 2010 Asian Junior and Cadet Table Tennis Championships
- Asian Table Tennis Union
