= Tamolwan Khetkhuan =

Thai table tennis player

Personal information
- Native name: ธมลวรรณ เขตต์เขื่อน
- Born: 9 June 1997 (age 29) Samut Prakan, Thailand
- Height: 1.66 m (5 ft 5 1/2 in)
- Weight: 52 kg (115 lb; 8.2 st)

Sport
- Sport: Table tennis
- Playing style: Right-handed, Shakehand grip
- Highest ranking: 99 (November 2017)
Medal record
Women's table tennis
Representing Thailand
Asian Games
Bronze medal – third place	2022 Hangzhou	Team
SEA Games
Silver medal – second place	2013 Naypyidaw	Team
Silver medal – second place	2015 Singapore	Team
Silver medal – second place	2017 Kuala Lumpur	Team

Tamolwan Khetkhuan (born 9 June 1997) is a Thai table tennis player. Her highest career ITTF ranking was 99.
