= Orawan Paranang =

Thai table tennis player

Personal information
- Native name: อรวรรณ พาระนัง
- Born: 7 September 1997 (age 29) Ubon Ratchathani, Thailand
- Height: 1.53 m (5 ft 0 in)
- Weight: 45 kg (99 lb)

Sport
- Sport: Table tennis
- Playing style: Left-handed, Shakehand grip
- Highest ranking: 34 (19 March 2024)
- Current ranking: 67 (15 July 2025)
Medal record
Women's Table Tennis
Representing Thailand
Asian Games
Bronze medal – third place	2022 Hangzhou	Team
Bronze medal – third place	2026 Aichi-Nagoya	Doubles
SEA Games
Gold medal – first place	2019 Philippines	Doubles
Gold medal – first place	2021 Vietnam	Singles
Gold medal – first place	2021 Vietnam	Doubles
Gold medal – first place	2021 Vietnam	Team
Gold medal – first place	2025 Thailand	Doubles
Gold medal – first place	2025 Thailand	Team
Silver medal – second place	2015 Singapore	Team
Silver medal – second place	2017 Kuala Lumpur	Team
Bronze medal – third place	2021 Vietnam	Mixed doubles
World University Games
Bronze medal – third place	2021 Chengdu	Singles

Orawan Paranang (Thai: อรวรรณ พาระนัง; born 7 September 1997) is a Thai table tennis player. She competed in the 2020 Summer Olympics.

== Achievements ==
Women's doubles

Year	Tournament	Level	Partner	Final opponents	Score	Rank
2018	Thailand Open	Challenge	Suthasini Sawettabut	Satsuki Odo; Saki Shibata	3–2	1st place, gold medalist(s)
2019	Indonesia Open	Challenge	Suthasini Sawettabut	Shao Jieni; Luo Xue	2–3	2nd place, silver medalist(s)
2020	Portugal Open	Challenge	Suthasini Sawettabut	Satsuki Odo; Saki Shibata	0–3	2nd place, silver medalist(s)
