= Koen Pang =

Singaporean table tennis player

Personal information
- Full name: Koen Pang Yew En
- Born: 8 May 2002 (age 24)

Sport
- Sport: Table tennis
- Current ranking: 119 (2 November 2026)
Medal record
Men's Table Tennis
Representing Singapore
Asian Championships
Silver medal – second place	2024 Astana	Doubles
Bronze medal – third place	2026 Tashkent	Doubles
SEA Games
Gold medal – first place	2019 Philippines	Singles
Silver medal – second place	2019 Philippines	Doubles

Koen Pang Yew En (Chinese: 冯耀恩; born 8 May 2002) is a Singaporean table tennis player. He is the first Singaporean to reach the ITTF Under-18 World Rank No. 1 (2019) and the first Singapore-born male to win the men's singles title at the Southeast Asian Games (2019). In March 2023, Pang and his doubles partner Izaac Quek became the first locally-born Singaporean table tennis players to break into the top 100 of the men's singles world rankings.

== Early life and education ==
Pang began playing table tennis at the age of five, joining his mother and elder brother in recreational games. Although he was initially involved in gymnastics, he chose to pursue table tennis as he found it more engaging. He dropped gymnastics at age 10 to focus entirely on table tennis.

Pang enrolled at the Singapore Sports School in 2015. Recognizing his talent and potential, he put his studies on hold to train full-time and was promoted to the Singapore National Team, effective 1 January 2019. Throughout his career, his family, particularly his mother, has been highly supportive of his passion for the sport.

== National service ==
Pang enlisted for full-time National Service in July 2020 as an infantry trooper with the 1st Battalion, Singapore Infantry Regiment (1 SIR). While serving, he balanced military duties with athletic training, practicing at the Singapore Table Tennis Association on weekends and weekday leave days. As a Lance Corporal, Pang was recognized for his "resilience, positivity and professionalism" and his "commitment as a soldier and national athlete", which earned him the respect of his fellow soldiers. He was awarded the 2021 NSF Of The Year by the Singapore Army. His National Service ended in May 2022. Reflecting on this period, Pang stated: "It is definitely challenging to balance both National Service and sport but you have to find time to train and make things work. I have learnt to be more disciplined, to persevere through hard times and learnt how to manage my time properly."

== Career ==
=== Junior career (2016–2019) ===
==== 2017–2018 ====
In 2017, Pang won three gold medals at the SEA Junior & Cadet Table Tennis Championships in the Cadet Boys Singles, Cadet Boys Doubles, and Cadet Boys Team events.

In 2018, Pang competed at the Youth Olympic Games in Buenos Aires, Argentina, reaching the quarter-finals (top 8) in the men's singles event. At the Commonwealth Games in Gold Coast, he reached the semi-finals in both men's doubles and men's team events.

At the 24th SEA Junior & Cadet Table Tennis Championships in 2018, Pang swept all four events, winning gold medals in Junior Boys' Singles, Junior Boys' Doubles, Mixed Doubles, and Junior Boys' Team. He also won three gold medals (Men's Doubles, Mixed Doubles, and Men's Team) and one silver (Men's Singles) at the 2018 SEA Table Tennis Championships.

==== 2019 breakthrough ====
On 13 January 2019, Pang won three gold medals at the STTA National Table Tennis Grand Finale in Mixed Doubles (with Wong Xin Ru), Men's Doubles (with Ethan Poh Shao Feng), and Men's Singles (defeating Josh Chua 4–0).

In September 2019, at age 17, Pang became the first Singaporean to reach No. 1 in the ITTF Under-18 world rankings.

At the 2019 World Junior Table Tennis Championships in Korat, Thailand, Pang and Josh Chua Shao Han won bronze in the Junior Boys' Doubles event, marking Singapore's first medal in this competition.

=== Southeast Asian Games ===
==== 2019 – First Singapore-born champion ====
At the 2019 Southeast Asian Games in Manila, Philippines, Pang made his SEA Games debut. In an all-Singapore and all-Sports School final, the 17-year-old defeated compatriot Clarence Chew Zhe Yu in straight sets to win the men's singles title, becoming the first Singapore-born male to win the event. His historic victory earned him The Straits Times Star of the Month award for December 2019. He also won silver in the men's doubles event.

==== 2021 – Mixed doubles gold ====
At the 2021 Southeast Asian Games in Hanoi, Vietnam (held in 2022), Pang won gold in the mixed doubles event partnering Wong Xin Ru, and earned joint bronze medals in both the men's doubles and men's team events.

==== 2023 – Double gold ====
At the 2023 Southeast Asian Games in Phnom Penh, Cambodia, Pang won two gold medals in the men's doubles (partnering Izaac Quek) and men's team events.

=== Commonwealth Games ===
At the 2022 Commonwealth Games in Birmingham, United Kingdom, Pang played a pivotal role in securing a silver medal for Singapore in the men's team category. He also competed in the mixed doubles, men's singles, and men's doubles events.

=== Senior international career ===
==== 2021 World Championships ====
While still completing his National Service, Pang competed at the 2021 World Table Tennis Championships in Houston, United States. He upset Brazil's 38th-ranked Gustavo Tsuboi 4–2 to reach the round of 32, where he faced former world No. 1 Timo Boll in a competitive match.

==== 2023 Singapore Smash ====
At the Singapore Smash 2023, Pang defeated Australia's Nicholas Lum (world No. 44) in straight games (11–3, 11–6, 11–4) in the round of 64 of the men's singles event.

==== 2024 Asian Table Tennis Championships ====
In October 2024, Pang and Izaac Quek finished runners-up in the men's doubles at the Asian Table Tennis Championships, ending Singapore's 11-year medal drought in the event. They became the first local-born pair to win a medal at the Asian Championships.

In their run to the final, they upset Japan's world No. 12 Tomokazu Harimoto and Sora Matsushima 3–2 (7–11, 5–11, 11–5, 11–7, 11–9) in the quarterfinals. In the semifinals, they defeated Malaysia's Javen Choong and Wong Qi Shen 3–0 (11–8, 11–3, 11–5) in 20 minutes before losing to South Korea's Lim Jonghoon and Ahn Jaehyun in the final.

==== 2024 WTT Finals ====
At the 2024 WTT Finals in Fukuoka, Japan, on 20 November, Pang and Quek stunned China's world No. 1 and defending champions Yuan Licen and Xiang Peng with a 3–0 (11–6, 11–6, 11–9) victory in just 21 minutes to advance to the semi-finals, described as the biggest scalp of their men's doubles career.

==== 2025 Europe Smash ====
At the inaugural Europe Smash in August 2025, Pang and Quek became the first Singaporeans to reach the semi-finals of a Grand Smash event. After receiving a first-round bye, they defeated Portuguese wildcards Marcos Freitas and Tiago Apolonia 3–2 (8–11, 11–8, 11–4, 3–11, 11–6) in the round of 16, then upset China's Liang Jingkun and Wen Ruibo 3–2 (7–11, 11–8, 14–12, 4–11, 11–8) in the quarterfinals. They lost to China's Lin Shidong and Huang Youzheng 3–0 (11–8, 11–5, 11–7) in the semi-finals.

=== Partnership with Izaac Quek ===
Pang and Quek began their doubles partnership in 2022. In March 2023, they became the first locally-born Singaporean table tennis players to break into the top 100 of the men's singles world rankings. Following their Asian Championships silver medal in October 2024, they rose to a career-high world No. 10 in men's doubles. In January 2025, they reached a new career-high of world No. 5 in men's doubles.

Commenting on their partnership, Pang stated: "Izaac and I have a lot of chemistry between us, so we understand each other's game really well. But there is still a lot of room for improvement, especially when we get into the rallies."

== Playing style ==
Pang is a left-handed attacking player.

== Career statistics ==
=== Major tournament results ===
Year	SEA Games Singles	SEA Games Doubles	SEA Games Mixed Doubles	SEA Games Team	Commonwealth Games Team	Asian Champ. Doubles	World Championships	Youth Olympics
2017	–	–	–	–	–	–	–	–
2018	–	–	–	–	SF	–	–	QF
2019	W	F	–	–	–	–	–	–
2020	–	–	–	–	–	–	–	–
2021	–	SF	W	SF	–	–	R32	–
2022	–	SF	W	SF	F	–	–	–
2023	–	W	–	W	–	–	–	–
2024	–	–	–	–	–	F	–	–
2025	–	–	–	–	–	–	–	–

Legend: W (Winner/Gold); F (Final/Silver); SF (Semi-final/Bronze); QF (Quarter-final); R32 (Round of 32); – (Did not participate)
