= Jinnipa Sawettabut =

Thai table tennis player (born 2000)

Personal information
- Native name: จิณห์นิภา เสวตรบุตร
- Born: May 19, 2000 (age 26) Ranong, Thailand
- Height: 1.68 m (5 ft 6 in)
- Weight: 63 kg (139 lb)

Sport
- Sport: Table tennis
- Playing style: Right-handed, Shakehand grip
Medal record
Women's table tennis
Representing Thailand
Asian Games
Bronze medal – third place	2022 Hangzhou	Team
Southeast Asian Games
Gold medal – first place	2021 SEA Games	Women's team
Gold medal – first place	2023 SEA Games	Women's team

Jinnipa Sawettabut (Thai: จิณห์นิภา เสวตรบุตร; born 19 May 2000) is a Thai professional table tennis player. She is a right-handed shakehand attacker. She represented Thailand at many competitions such as Southeast Asian Games and representing Thailand at the 2024 Summer Olympics in Paris. She is the sister of Suthasini Sawettabut.

Jinnipa first appeared on SEA Games and earned gold medals in 2021 and 2023. She represented Thailand at the World Table Tennis Championships and the Asian Table Tennis Championships, and the 2024 Summer Olympics.
