= Goi Rui Xuan =

Singaporean table tennis player

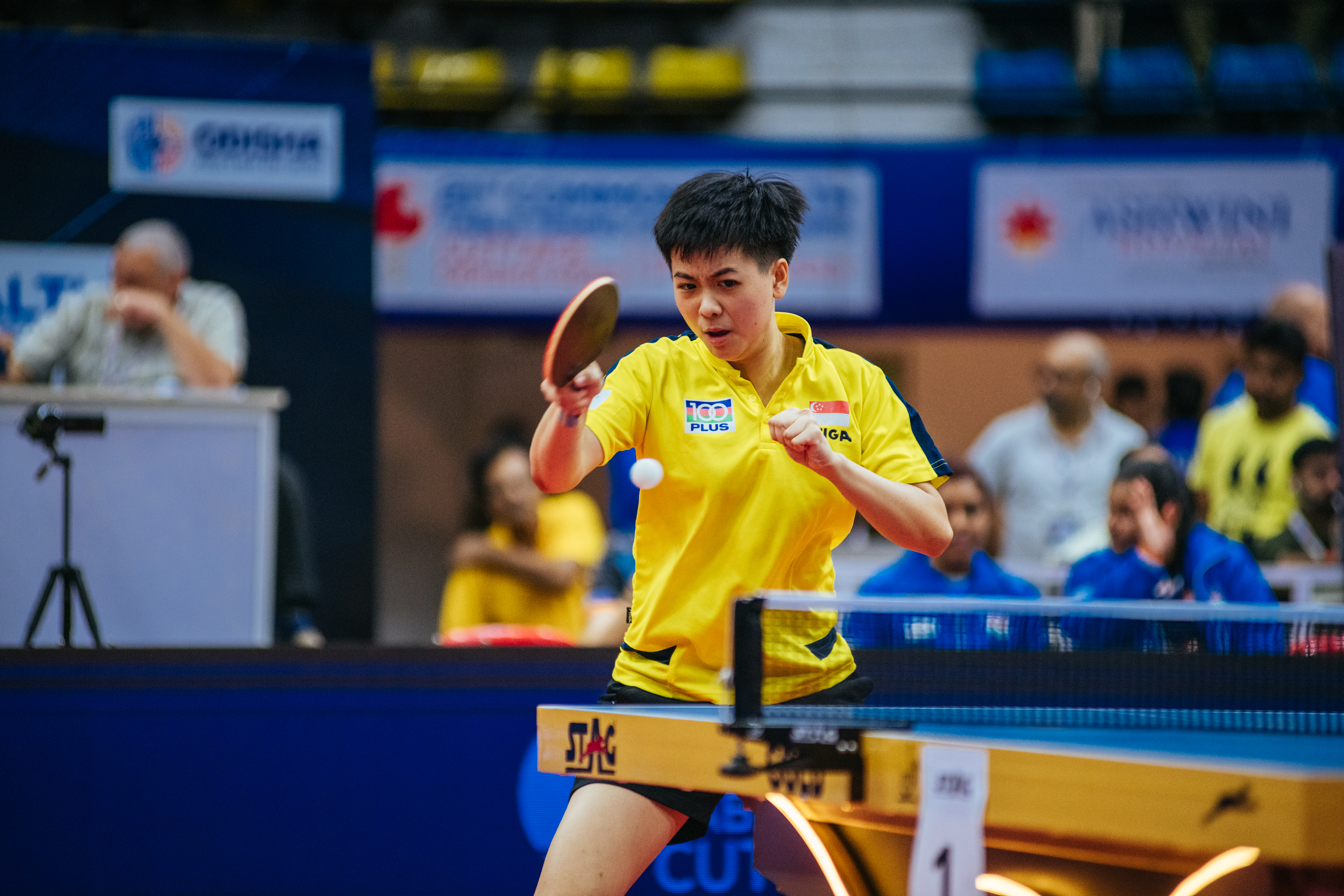
- Goi Rui Xuan in Commonwealth 2019 at Singapore

Personal information
- Native name: 魏睿萱
- Born: 26 February 2001 (age 25) Singapore

Sport
- Sport: Table tennis
- Playing style: Right-handed Shakehand grip
Medal record
Women's Table Tennis
Representing Singapore
Asian Championships
Bronze medal – third place	2019 Yogyakarta	Team
Bronze medal – third place	2021 Doha	Team
Southeast Asian Games
Silver medal – second place	2021 Vietnam	Team
Bronze medal – third place	2019 Philippines	Doubles

Goi Rui Xuan (born 26 February 2001) is a Singaporean table tennis player. Her highest career ITTF ranking was 188.

== Education ==
Goi studied at Singapore Sports School for four years, and had deferred her diploma studies which was offered as part of a through-train programme, to train full time.

== Career ==
In 2017, Goi participated in table tennis mixed doubles event at the 2017 Asean School Games with Gerald Yu, and won gold.

In 2018, Goi qualified for the table tennis singles event at the 2018 Summer Youth Olympics, and represented Singapore. In 2019, Goi participated in table tennis women's doubles event at the 2019 Southeast Asian Games along with Wong Xin Ru, and won bronze medal.
