= Wong Xin Ru =

Singaporean table tennis player

Personal information
- Born: 19 December 2001 (age 24) Singapore
- Education: National University of Singapore
- Height: 1.75 m (5 ft 9 in)

Sport
- Country: Singapore
- Sport: Table tennis
Medal record
Women's Table Tennis
Representing Singapore
SEA Games
Bronze medal – third place	2019 Philippines	Doubles
Gold medal – first place	2021 Vietnam	Mixed Doubles
Silver medal – second place	2021 Vietnam	Team
Silver medal – second place	2023 Cambodia	Doubles
Bronze medal – third place	2023 Cambodia	Team
Commonwealth Games
Gold medal – first place	2022 Birmingham	Team

Won Xin Ru at 2019 Commonwealth Table Tennis championships

Wong Xin Ru (born 19 December 2001) is a retired Singaporean table tennis player. She represented Singapore at multiple international competitions, including three SEA Games (2019, 2021 and 2023), 2022 Commonwealth Games, and various World Table Tennis (WTT) events.

== Education ==
Wong studied at the Singapore Sports School. Wong graduated from Ngee Ann Polytechnic in 2021 and paused her studies to train for qualification for the 2024 Summer Olympics held in Paris, France.

Wong had a placing at the National University of Singapore's College of Humanities and Sciences.

== Career ==
Wong was introduced to table tennis by her father at the age of nine.

Wong became a full-time athlete in September 2021 after years of training and competing to train to qualify for the 2024 Summer Olympics. In March 2024, the table tennis team failed to qualify for the Olympics.

During the 2022 Commonwealth Games held in Birmingham, England, Wong won the gold medal in the table tennis Women's Team event

In 2022, Wong secured two second-place finishes in Mixed Doubles with partner Koen Pang at both the WTT Feeder Varazdin and WTT Feeder Havirov.

On 10 July 2024, at the age of 22, Wong announced her retirement from competitive table tennis to pursue her studies.

== Key career records ==
Legend : Gold Silver Bronze QR: Qualifying Round

Event	Results	Date	Competition
2019
Women's Doubles		7 December 2019	30th Southeast Asian Games; Philippines
2021
Mixed Doubles (With Koen Pang)		18 May 2021	31st Southeast Asian Games; Hanoi, Vietnam
Women's Team (With Zhou Jingyi, Zeng Jian, Goi Rui Xuan and Zhang Wanlin)		15 May 2021	31st Southeast Asian Games; Hanoi, Vietnam
2022
Women's Team (With Zeng Jian, Zhou Jingyi and Feng Tianwei)		1 August 2022	2022 Commonwealth Games; Birmingham, England
2023
Women's Doubles (With Zhou Jingyi)		14 May 2023	2023 SEA Games; Phnom Penh, Cambodia
Women's Team (With Zhou Jingyi, Zeng Jian, Goi Rui Xuan, Ser Lin Qian)		10 May 2023	2023 SEA Games; Phnom Penh, Cambodia

== Personal life ==
Wong is a vegetarian and had maintained a vegetarian diet throughout her table tennis career.
