= 2022 South East Asian Table Tennis Championships =

- Date: 23–28 June 2022
- Edition: 12th
- Location: Bangkok, Thailand
- Venue: Fashion Island Hall 3rd

Champions

Men's singles
- (Singapore) Clarence Chew

Women's singles
- (Thailand) Suthasini Sawettabut

Men's doubles
- (Singapore) Clarence Chew / (Singapore) Poh Shao Feng Ethan

Women's doubles
- (Thailand) Suthasini Sawettabut / (Thailand) Orawan Paranang

Mixed doubles
- (Singapore) Clarence Chew / (Singapore) Zeng Jian

Men's team
- Thailand

Women's team
- Thailand
- South East Asian Table Tennis Championships

The 12th South East Asian Table Tennis Championships 2022 were played in Bangkok, Thailand from 23 to 28 June 2022. The Table Tennis Association of Thailand hosted both the 12th SEATTC and the 26th SEAJCTTC. Both championships were played in the same venue at the Fashion Island Hall 3rd.

== Schedule ==
Five individual and two team events were contested.

Rounds in main draw
Finals

Date	23 June	24 June		25 June		26 June		27 June		28 June	
Men's singles				R1	R2	R3	R/32	R/16	QF	SF	F
Women's singles				R1	R2	R3	R/32	R/16	QF	SF	F
Men's doubles				R16		QF		SF		F	
Women's doubles				R16		QF		SF		F	
Mixed doubles				R32	R16	QF	SF	F			
Men's team	GS	SF	F								
Women's team	GS	SF	F								

== Participating ==
=== Participating nations ===
- Cambodia (4)
- Indonesia (8)
- Laos (6)
- Malaysia (10)
- Philippines (10)
- Singapore (10)
- Thailand (10)
- Vietnam (10)

== Medal summary ==
=== Medal table ===
* Host nation (Thailand)

Rank	Nation	Gold	Silver	Bronze	Total
1	Thailand*	4	3	2	9
2	Singapore	3	2	6	11
3	Malaysia	0	1	3	4
4	Vietnam	0	1	0	1
5	Indonesia	0	0	3	3
Totals (5 entries)		7	7	14	28

=== Events ===
Event	Gold	Silver	Bronze
Men's singles	(Singapore) Clarence Chew	(Vietnam) Nguyen Anh Tu	(Singapore) Beh Kun Ting
Men's singles	(Singapore) Clarence Chew	(Vietnam) Nguyen Anh Tu	(Singapore) Pang Yew En Koen
Women's singles	(Thailand) Suthasini Sawettabut	(Thailand) Orawan Paranang	(Malaysia) Karen Lyne Anak Dick
Women's singles	(Thailand) Suthasini Sawettabut	(Thailand) Orawan Paranang	(Thailand) Jinnipa Sawettabut
Men's doubles	(Singapore) Clarence Chew (Singapore) Poh Shao Feng Ethan	(Singapore) Pang Yew En Koen (Singapore) Quek Yong Izaac	(Indonesia) Rafanael Nikola Niman (Indonesia) Hafidh Nuur Annafi
Men's doubles	(Singapore) Clarence Chew (Singapore) Poh Shao Feng Ethan	(Singapore) Pang Yew En Koen (Singapore) Quek Yong Izaac	(Thailand) Padasak Tanviriyavechakul (Thailand) Sarayut Tancharoen
Women's doubles	(Thailand) Suthasini Sawettabut (Thailand) Orawan Paranang	(Thailand) Jinnipa Sawettabut (Thailand) Wanwisa Aueawiriyayothin	(Malaysia) Karen Lyne Anak Dick (Malaysia) Ho Ying
Women's doubles	(Thailand) Suthasini Sawettabut (Thailand) Orawan Paranang	(Thailand) Jinnipa Sawettabut (Thailand) Wanwisa Aueawiriyayothin	(Singapore) Zeng Jian (Singapore) Wong Xin Ru
Mixed doubles	(Singapore) Clarence Chew (Singapore) Zeng Jian	(Thailand) Phakpoom Sanguansin (Thailand) Orawan Paranang	(Singapore) Quek Yong Izaac (Singapore) Zhou Jingyi
Mixed doubles	(Singapore) Clarence Chew (Singapore) Zeng Jian	(Thailand) Phakpoom Sanguansin (Thailand) Orawan Paranang	(Singapore) Poh Shao Feng Ethan (Singapore) Goi Rui Xuan
Men's team	Thailand; Padasak Tanviriyavechakul; Phakpoom Sanguansin; Pattaratorn Passara; Sarayut Tancharoen; Satapond Jermplang	Malaysia; Leong Chee Feng; Choong Javen; Wong Qi Shen; Danny Ng Wann Sing; Lee Yong Yi	Indonesia; Benjamin Mulia Pratikto; Rafanael Nikola Niman; Fikri Faqih Fadilah; Hafidh Nuur Annafi
Men's team	Thailand; Padasak Tanviriyavechakul; Phakpoom Sanguansin; Pattaratorn Passara; Sarayut Tancharoen; Satapond Jermplang	Malaysia; Leong Chee Feng; Choong Javen; Wong Qi Shen; Danny Ng Wann Sing; Lee Yong Yi	Singapore; Pang Yew En Koen; Quek Yong Izaac; Poh Shao Feng Ethan; Beh Kun Ting; Clarence Chew
Women's team	Thailand; Suthasini Sawettabut; Orawan Paranang; Jinnipa Sawettabut; Wirakarn Tayapitak; Wanwisa Aueawiriyayothin	Singapore; Zeng Jian; Zhou Jingyi; Goi Rui Xuan; Wong Xin Ru; Zhang Wanling	Indonesia; Novida Widarahman; Siti Aminah; Dwi Oktaviany Sugiarto; Cindy Marcella Putri
Women's team	Thailand; Suthasini Sawettabut; Orawan Paranang; Jinnipa Sawettabut; Wirakarn Tayapitak; Wanwisa Aueawiriyayothin	Singapore; Zeng Jian; Zhou Jingyi; Goi Rui Xuan; Wong Xin Ru; Zhang Wanling	Malaysia; Ho Ying; Karen Lyne Anak Dick; Tee Ai Xin; Alice Chang Li Sian; Im Li Ying

== See also ==
- Asian Table Tennis Union
- Asian Table Tennis Championships
- 26th South East Asian Junior and Cadet Table Tennis Championships 2022
