= 2022 South East Asian Table Tennis Championships – Men's team =

Men's team at the 2022 South East Asian Table Tennis Championships
- Venue: Fashion Island Hall 3rd
- Location: Bangkok, Thailand
- Dates: 23–24 June
- Competitors: 29 from 8 nations

Medalists
gold medal	Padasak Tanviriyavechakul; Phakpoom Sanguansin; Pattaratorn Passara; Sarayut Tancharoen; Satapond Jermplang	Thailand
silver medal	Leong Chee Feng; Choong Javen; Wong Qi Shen; Danny Ng Wann Sing; Lee Yong Yi	Malaysia
bronze medal	Benjamin Mulia Pratikto; Rafanael Nikola Niman; Fikri Faqih Fadilah; Hafidh Nuur Annafi	Indonesia
bronze medal	Pang Yew En Koen; Quek Yong Izaac; Poh Shao Feng Ethan; Beh Kun Ting; Clarence Chew	Singapore

The men's team at the 2022 South East Asian Table Tennis Championships in Bangkok, Thailand was held at Fashion Island Hall 3rd from 23 to 24 June 2022.

== Schedule ==
All times are Thailand Standard Time (UTC+07:00)

Date	Time	Round
Thursday, 23 June 2022	10:00	Group Stage
Friday, 24 June 2022	12:00	Semifinals
Friday, 24 June 2022	17:00	Finals

== Group Stage ==
=== Group A ===
Pos	Team	Pld	W	L	Pts	Promotion	SGP	INA	LAO	CAM
1	Singapore	3	3	0	6	Advance to Main Draw	—	3–1	3–0	3–0
2	Indonesia	3	2	1	5	Advance to Main Draw	1–3	—	3–0	3–0
3	Laos	3	1	2	4		0–3	0–3	—	3–1
4	Cambodia	3	0	3	3		0–3	0–3	1–3	—

Source: SEATTC - Men's team

23 June 2022; 10:00	Singapore	3–0	Laos	Fashion Island Hall 3rd, Bangkok; Match 1 Table 4

23 June 2022; 10:00	Indonesia	3–0	Cambodia	Fashion Island Hall 3rd, Bangkok; Match 2 Table 2

23 June 2022; 13:00	Singapore	3–1	Indonesia	Fashion Island Hall 3rd, Bangkok; Match 7 Table 3

23 June 2022; 13:00	Laos	3–1	Cambodia	Fashion Island Hall 3rd, Bangkok; Match 8 Table 2

23 June 2022; 16:30	Singapore	3–0	Cambodia	Fashion Island Hall 3rd, Bangkok; Match 13; Table 4

23 June 2022; 16:30	Indonesia	3–0	Laos	Fashion Island Hall 3rd, Bangkok; Match 14; Table 2

=== Group B ===
Pos	Team	Pld	W	L	Pts	Promotion	MAS	THA	VIE	PHI
1	Malaysia	3	3	0	6	Advance to Main Draw	—	3–2	3–2	3–0
2	Thailand	3	2	1	5	Advance to Main Draw	2–3	—	3–1	3–0
3	Vietnam	3	1	2	4		2–3	1–3	—	3–2
4	Philippines	3	0	3	3		0–3	0–3	2–3	—

Source: SEATTC - Men's team

23 June 2022; 10:00	Malaysia	3–2	Vietnam	Fashion Island Hall 3rd, Bangkok; Match 3 Table 3

23 June 2022; 10:00	Thailand	3–0	Philippines	Fashion Island Hall 3rd, Bangkok; Match 4 Table 1

Report	Individual matches
Padasak Tanviriyavechakul	3–0	Eljey Dan Tormis	13 – 11, 11 – 5, 11 – 9
Sarayut Tancharoen	3–1	Jann Mari Nayre	9 – 11, 11 – 7, 11 – 8, 11 – 5
Phakpoom Sanguansin	3–0	John Michael Castro	11 – 8, 11 – 2, 9 – 11, 8 – 11, 11 – 5

23 June 2022; 13:00	Thailand	2–3	Malaysia	Fashion Island Hall 3rd, Bangkok; Match 9 Table 1

Report	Individual matches
Padasak Tanviriyavechakul	3–0	Choong Javen	11 – 6, 11 – 6, 11 – 5
Phakpoom Sanguansin	1–3	Leong Chee Feng	11 – 9, 9 – 11, 8 – 11, 7 – 11
Sarayut Tancharoen	2–3	Wong Qi Shen	5 – 11, 11 – 6, 11 – 6, 2 – 11, 5 – 11
Padasak Tanviriyavechakul	3–2	Leong Chee Feng	11 – 13, 11 – 5, 6 – 11, 11 – 8, 11 – 9
Phakpoom Sanguansin	1–3	Choong Javen	7 – 11, 11 – 6, 5 – 11, 10 – 12

23 June 2022; 13:00	Vietnam	3–2	Philippines	Fashion Island Hall 3rd, Bangkok; Match 10; Table 4

23 June 2022; 16:30	Malaysia	3–0	Philippines	Fashion Island Hall 3rd, Bangkok; Match 15; Table 3

23 June 2022; 16:30	Thailand	3–1	Vietnam	Fashion Island Hall 3rd, Bangkok; Match 16; Table 1

Report	Individual matches
Phakpoom Sanguansin	3–1	Nguyen Anh Tu	11 – 9, 13 – 11, 4 – 11, 11 – 5
Padasak Tanviriyavechakul	2–3	Dinh Anh Hoang	11 – 13, 11 – 8, 11 – 7, 5 – 11, 9 – 11
Pattaratorn Passara	3–2	Le Dinh Duc	9 – 11, 11 – 6, 8 – 11, 11 – 4, 11 – 9
Padasak Tanviriyavechakul	3–1	Nguyen Anh Tu	4 – 11, 11 – 5, 11 – 8, 13 – 11

== Main bracket ==
Semifinals
Singapore	1
Thailand	3
Indonesia	0
Malaysia	3

Final
Thailand	3
Malaysia	2

=== Semifinals ===
24 June 2022; 12:00	Singapore	1–3	Thailand	Fashion Island Hall 3rd, Bangkok; Match D2-3; Table 1

Report	Individual matches
Pang Yew En Koen	3–0	Phakpoom Sanguansin	6 – 11, 7 – 11, 9 – 11
Quek Yong Izaac	0–3	Padasak Tanviriyavechakul	11 – 7, 11 – 7, 11 – 6
Poh Shao Feng Ethan	1–3	Sarayut Tancharoen	9 – 11, 11 – 7, 11 – 8, 11 – 8
Pang Yew En Koen	0–3	Padasak Tanviriyavechakul	11 – 8, 8 – 11, 11 – 7, 8 – 11, 11 – 5

24 June 2022; 12:00	Indonesia	0–3	Malaysia	Fashion Island Hall 3rd, Bangkok; Match D2-4; Table 2

=== Gold-medal match ===
24 June 2022; 17:00	Thailand	3–2	Malaysia	Fashion Island Hall 3rd, Bangkok; Match D2-6; Table 1

Report	Individual matches
Sarayut Tancharoen	0–3	Leong Chee Feng	11 – 13, 10 – 12, 8 – 11
Padasak Tanviriyavechakul	3–1	Choong Javen	8 – 11, 11 – 9, 11 – 8, 11 – 8
Phakpoom Sanguansin	2–3	Wong Qi Shen	11 – 6, 13 – 11, 6 – 11, 4 – 11, 3 – 11
Padasak Tanviriyavechakul	3–2	Leong Chee Feng	7 – 11, 6 – 11, 11 – 5, 11 – 4, 11 – 7
Sarayut Tancharoen	3–2	Choong Javen	9 – 11, 1 – 11, 11 – 8, 12 – 10, 11 – 7
