= 2022 South East Asian Table Tennis Championships – Mixed doubles =

Table tennis competition

Mixed doubles at the 2022 South East Asian Table Tennis Championships
- Venue: Fashion Island Hall 3rd
- Location: Bangkok, Thailand
- Date: 25–27 June
- Competitors: 54 from 7 nations

Medalists
gold medal	Clarence Chew; Zeng Jian	Singapore
silver medal	Phakpoom Sanguansin; Orawan Paranang	Thailand
bronze medal	Quek Yong Izaac; Zhou Jingyi	Singapore
bronze medal	Poh Shao Feng Ethan; Goi Rui Xuan	Singapore

The mixed doubles at the 2022 South East Asian Table Tennis Championships in Bangkok, Thailand was held at Fashion Island Hall 3rd from 25 to 27 June 2022.

== Schedule ==
All times are Thailand Standard Time (UTC+07:00)

Date	Time	Round
Saturday, 25 June 2022	10:00	R1 (1/32)
Saturday, 25 June 2022	13:00	R2 (1/16)
Friday, 26 June 2022	10:00	Quarterfinals
Friday, 26 June 2022	16:00	Semifinals
Monday, 27 June 2022	17:00	Final

== Main bracket ==
=== Top Draw ===
Round of 32
(Laos) S Vongdalasinh (Laos) N Kongphet	4	1	11	5	1
(Philippines) J Adasa (Philippines) KR Cruz	11	11	8	11	3
(Malaysia) Ng WSD (Malaysia) Chang LSA	11	11	12	7	11	3
(Vietnam) Dinh AH (Vietnam) Tran MN	8	7	14	11	8	2
(Thailand) P Sanguansin (Thailand) O Paranang	11	11	11	3
(Vietnam) Le DD (Vietnam) Nguyen TN	5	8	4	0
(Indonesia) HN Annafi (Indonesia) S Aminah	9	11	7	6	1
(Malaysia) Wong QS (Malaysia) Ho Y	11	9	11	11	3
(Malaysia) Lee YY (Malaysia) Im LY	11	11	5	11	3
(Philippines) ED Tormis (Philippines) SM Otanes	9	6	11	4	1

Round of 16
(Thailand) P Tanviriyavechakul (Thailand) S Sawettabut	11	11	11	3
(Philippines) J Adasa (Philippines) KR Cruz	3	8	5	0
(Malaysia) Ng WSD (Malaysia) Chang LSA	8	3	6	0
(Singapore) Quek YI (Singapore) Zhou J	11	11	11	3
(Thailand) P Sanguansin (Thailand) O Paranang	11	12	11	3
(Malaysia) Wong QS (Malaysia) Ho Y	7	10	8	0
(Malaysia) Lee YY (Malaysia) Im LY	15	5	11	3	7	2
(Singapore) Pang YEK (Singapore) Wong XR	13	11	5	11	11	3

Quarterfinals
(Thailand) P Tanviriyavechakul (Thailand) S Sawettabut	8	8	11	7	1
(Singapore) Quek YI (Singapore) Zhou J	11	11	6	11	3
(Thailand) P Sanguansin (Thailand) O Paranang	8	11	11	11	3
(Singapore) Pang YEK (Singapore) Wong XR	11	6	8	6	1

Semifinals
(Singapore) Quek YI (Singapore) Zhou J	9	11	12	3	8	2
(Thailand) P Sanguansin (Thailand) O Paranang	11	8	10	11	11	3

=== Bottom Draw ===
Round of 32
(Thailand) S Jermplang (Thailand) W Tayapitak	12	11	7	11	3
(Vietnam) Doan BTA (Vietnam) Nguyen TKM	10	5	11	9	1
(Malaysia) Leong CF (Malaysia) Tee AX	11	13	11	3
(Vietnam) Nguyen VH (Vietnam) Bui NL	6	11	4	0
(Philippines) JM Castro (Philippines) ER Dael	11	6	6	12	11	3
(Thailand) S Tancharoen (Thailand) J Sawettabut	9	11	11	10	6	2
(Singapore) Tan L (Singapore) Zhang W	6	11	6	11	11	3
(Malaysia) Choong J (Malaysia) KLA Dick	11	6	11	5	3	2
(Philippines) JM Nayre (Philippines) AJ Laude	11	11	11	3
(Thailand) P Passara (Thailand) W Aueawiriyayothin	6	5	7	0
(Indonesia) RN Niman (Indonesia) N Widarahman	3	9	9	0
(Vietnam) Nguyen AT (Vietnam) Nguyen KDK	11	11	11	3

Round of 16
(Singapore) Poh ShFE (Singapore) Goi RX	4	11	9	15	11	3
(Thailand) S Jermplang (Thailand) W Tayapitak	11	5	11	13	6	2
(Malaysia) Leong CF (Malaysia) Tee AX	11	9	11	11	3
(Philippines) JM Castro (Philippines) ER Dael	9	11	8	1
(Singapore) Tan L (Singapore) Zhang W	5	8	6	0
(Philippines) JM Nayre (Philippines) AJ Laude	11	11	11	3
(Vietnam) Nguyen AT (Vietnam) Nguyen KDK	11	5	9	3	1
(Singapore) Chew ZYC (Singapore) Zeng J	7	11	11	11	3

Quarterfinals
(Singapore) Poh ShFE (Singapore) Goi RX	11	11	11	3
(Malaysia) Leong CF (Malaysia) Tee AX	7	9	3	0
(Philippines) JM Nayre (Philippines) AJ Laude	5	6	1	0
(Singapore) Chew ZYC (Singapore) Zeng J	11	11	11	3

Semifinals
(Singapore) Poh ShFE (Singapore) Goi RX	8	11	11	11	6	2
(Singapore) Chew ZYC (Singapore) Zeng J	11	8	6	13	11	3

== Final bracket ==
Semifinals							Final
(Singapore) Quek YI (Singapore) Zhou J	9	11	12	3	8	2
(Thailand) P Sanguansin (Thailand) O Paranang	11	8	10	11	11	3	(Thailand) P Sanguansin (Thailand) O Paranang	11	11	9	10	6	2
(Singapore) Poh ShFE (Singapore) Goi RX	8	11	11	11	6	2	(Singapore) Chew ZYC (Singapore) Zeng J	4	8	11	12	11	3
(Singapore) Chew ZYC (Singapore) Zeng J	11	8	6	13	11	3
