= 2022 South East Asian Table Tennis Championships – Men's singles =

Table tennis competition

Men's singles at the 2022 South East Asian Table Tennis Championships
- Venue: Fashion Island Hall 3rd
- Location: Bangkok, Thailand
- Date: 25–28 June
- Competitors: 38 from 8 nations

Medalists
gold medal	Clarence Chew Zhe Yu	Singapore
silver medal	Nguyen Anh Tu	Vietnam
bronze medal	Beh Kun Ting	Singapore
bronze medal	Pang Yew En Koen	Singapore

The men's singles at the 2022 South East Asian Table Tennis Championships in Bangkok, Thailand was held at Fashion Island Hall 3rd from 25 to 28 June 2022.

== Schedule ==
All times are Thailand Standard Time (UTC+07:00).

Date	Time	Round
Saturday, 25 June 2022	15:00	Group Stage
Sunday, 26 June 2022	11:30	Group Stage
Sunday, 26 June 2022	17:30	R/32
Monday, 27 June 2022	10:00	R/16
Monday, 27 June 2022	14:00	Quarterfinals
Tuesday, 28 June 2022	10:50	Semifinals
Tuesday, 28 June 2022	Followed by Women's singles final	Final

== Group stage ==
The group stage was as follows:

=== Group 1 ===
No.	Number	Group 1	1	2	3	W	L	PTS	POS
1	SGP106	(Singapore) Clarence Chew Zhe Yu	–	3:1(9, 5, -9, 6)	3:0(1, 3, 1)	2	0	4	1
2	THA102	(Thailand) Phakpoom Sanguansin	1:3	–	3:0(4, 5, 2)	1	1	3	2
3	CAM101	(Cambodia) Yiv Sovanpanha	0:3	0:3	–	0	2	2	3

=== Group 2 ===
No.	Number	Group 2	1	2	3	W	L	PTS	POS
1	SGP101	(Singapore) Pang Yew En Koen	–	3:0(5, 11, 2)	3:0(7, 4, 6)	2	0	4	1
2	CAM103	(Cambodia) Khun Phannith	0:3	–	2:3(5, 8, -6, -8, 5)	0	2	2	3
3	LAO105	(Laos) Anane Vongsa	0:3	3:2	–	1	1	3	2

=== Group 3 ===
No.	Number	Group 3	1	2	3	W	L	PTS	POS
1	SGP103	(Singapore) Poh Shao Feng Ethan	–	2:3(2, 7, -2, -11, 6)	3:0(5, 4, 3)	1	1	3	2
2	MAS105	(Malaysia) Lee Yong Yi	3:2	–	3:0(5, 6, 7)	2	0	4	1
3	LAO101	(Laos) Sonpasith Mosangsinh	0:3	0:3	–	0	2	2	3

=== Group 4 ===
No.	Number	Group 4	1	2	3	W	L	PTS	POS
1	SGP102	(Singapore) Quek Yong Izaac	–	3:0(2, 7, 4)	3:0(9, 3, 2)	2	0	4	1
2	LAO103	(Laos) Phinith Kongphet	0:3	–	0:3(5, 5, 4)	0	2	2	3
3	PHI103	(Philippines) Japheth Adasa	0:3	3:0	–	1	1	3	2

=== Group 5 ===
No.	Number	Group 5	1	2	3	W	L	PTS	POS
1	SGP104	(Singapore) Beh Kun Ting	–	3:0(7, 9, 2)	3:1(6, -9, 8, 6)	2	0	4	1
2	INA103	(Indonesia) Fikri Faqih Fadilah	0:3	–	0:3(8, 5, 8)	0	2	2	3
3	PHI105	(Philippines) Eljey Dan Tormis	1:3	3:0	–	1	1	3	2

=== Group 6 ===
No.	Number	Group 6	1	2	3	W	L	PTS	POS
1	THA101	(Thailand) Padasak Tanviriyavechakul	–	3:1(11, 4, -8, 6)	3:0(10, 6, 2)	2	0	4	1
2	INA102	(Indonesia) Rafanael Nikola Niman	1:3	–	1:3(-6, 7, 9, 8)	0	2	2	3
3	VIE102	(Vietnam) Nguyen Van Huan	0:3	3:1	–	1	1	3	2

=== Group 7 ===
No.	Number	Group 7	1	2	3	W	L	PTS	POS
1	MAS101	(Malaysia) Leong Chee Feng	–	1:3(9, 8, -9, 9)	3:0(7, 6, 5)	1	1	3	1
2	THA105	(Thailand) Satapond Jermplang	3:1	–	1:3(10, -8, 6, 6)	1	1	3	2
3	VIE103	(Vietnam) Doan Ba Tuan Anh	0:3	3:1	–	1	1	3	3

=== Group 8 ===
No.	Number	Group 8	1	2	3	W	L	PTS	POS
1	MAS103	(Malaysia) Wong Qi Shen	–	3:0(1, 6, 6)	3:2(-7, 6, -7, 8, 5)	2	0	4	1
2	CAM104	(Cambodia) Bun Visal	3:0	–	0:3(5, 4, 3)	0	2	2	3
3	INA104	(Indonesia) Hafidh Nuur Annafi	2:3	3:0	–	1	1	3	2

=== Group 9 ===
No.	Number	Group 9	1	2	3	W	L	PTS	POS
1	VIE101	(Vietnam) Nguyen Anh Tu	–	3:2(-13, 5, -7, 6, 7)	3:0(5, 10, 9)	2	0	4	1
2	THA104	(Thailand) Sarayut Tancharoen	2:3	–	3:1(5, -6, 5, 7)	1	1	3	2
3	MAS104	(Malaysia) Danny Ng Wann Sing	0:3	1:3	–	0	2	2	3

=== Group 10 ===
No.	Number	Group 10	1	2	3	W	L	PTS	POS
1	PHI101	(Philippines) Jann Mari Nayre	–	3:2(7, -14, -10, 5, 5)	1:3(5, -7, 6, 8)	1	1	3	2
2	THA103	(Thailand) Pattaratorn Passara	2:3	–	3:0(9, 7, 5)	1	1	3	1
3	INA101	(Indonesia) Benjamin Mulia Pratikto	3:1	0:3	–	1	1	3	3

=== Group 11 ===
No.	Number	Group 11	1	2	3	4	W	L	PTS	POS
1	CAM102	(Cambodia) Sarak Sou Pring	–	1:3(6, -6, 10, 7)	0:3(4, 3, 9)	0:3(7, 9, 8)	0	3	3	4
2	LAO104	(Laos) Phoumpanya Phathitmyxay	3:1	–	1:3(-9, 10, 5, 6)	0:3(3, 7, 4)	1	2	4	3
3	PHI104	(Philippines) John Michael Castro	3:0	3:1	–	0:3(8, 5, 8)	2	1	5	2
4	VIE105	(Vietnam) Dinh Anh Hoang	3:0	3:0	3:0	–	3	0	6	1

=== Group 12 ===
No.	Number	Group 12	1	2	3	4	W	L	PTS	POS
1	LAO102	(Laos) Sengarthid Vongdalasinh	–	0:3(10, 8, 5)	0:3(3, 9, 9)	0:3(6, 5, 11)	0	3	3	4
2	MAS102	(Malaysia) Choong Javen	3:0	–	3:0(8, 7, 11)	2:3(-12, 6, 2, -8, 8)	2	1	5	2
3	PHI102	(Philippines) John Russel Misal	3:0	0:3	–	2:3(-9, 8, 6, -6, 8)	1	2	4	3
4	VIE104	(Vietnam) Le Dinh Duc	3:0	3:2	3:2	–	3	0	6	1

== Main bracket ==
=== Top Draw ===
Round of 32
(Philippines) JM Nayre	11	5	11	11	3
(Vietnam) Dinh AH	9	11	9	8	1
(Laos) A Vongsa	9	11	4	8	1
(Indonesia) HN Annafi	11	10	11	11	3
(Thailand) S Tancharoen	11	11	11	3
(Vietnam) Le DD	7	9	6	0
(Philippines) J Adasa	11	5	2	8	1
(Thailand) S Jermplang	9	11	11	11	3

Round of 16
(Singapore) Chew ZYC	11	11	11	3
(Philippines) JM Nayre	6	7	5	0
(Indonesia) HN Annafi	6	6	3	0
(Thailand) P Tanviriyavechakul	11	11	11	3
(Singapore) Beh KT	11	11	11	3
(Thailand) S Tancharoen	6	7	8	0
(Thailand) S Jermplang	11	11	10	8	11	3
(Malaysia) Lee YY	5	8	11	11	5	2

Quarterfinals
(Singapore) Chew ZYC	11	11	11	3
(Thailand) P Tanviriyavechakul	7	6	6
(Singapore) Beh KT	11	11	11	3
(Thailand) S Jermplang	6	3	2	0

Semifinals
(Singapore) Chew ZYC	3	10	11	11	11	11	4
(Singapore) Beh KT	11	12	5	8	7	6	2

=== Bottom Draw ===
Round of 32
(Thailand) P Sanguansin	7	11	14	11	3
(Philippines) JM Castro	11	6	12	7	1
(Vietnam) Nguyen AT	12	11	8	11	3
(Vietnam) Nguyen VH	10	9	11	1	1
(Philippines) ED Tormis	9	6	16	3	1
(Thailand) P Passara	11	11	14	11	3
(Malaysia) Choong J	8	7	4	0
(Singapore) Poh SFE	11	11	11	3

Round of 16
(Singapore) Quek YI	11	15	11	3
(Thailand) P Sanguansin	9	13	3	0
(Vietnam) Nguyen AT	11	12	11	3
(Malaysia) Wong QS	5	3	9	0
(Malaysia) Leong CF	14	11	13	3
(Thailand) P Passara	12	9	11	0
(Singapore) Poh SFE	5	6	13	11	7	2
(Singapore) Pang YEK	11	11	11	8	11	3

Quarterfinals
(Singapore) Quek YI	10	3	9	0
(Vietnam) Nguyen Anh Tu	11	11	11	3
(Malaysia) Leong CF	6	7	9	0
(Singapore) Pang YEK	11	11	11	3

Semifinals
(Vietnam) Nguyen AT	11	11	11	11	8	11	4
(Singapore) Pang YEK	7	13	3	9	11	4	2

== Final bracket ==
Semifinals								Final
(Singapore) Chew ZYC	3	10	11	11	11	11	4
(Singapore) Beh KT	11	12	5	8	7	6	2	(Singapore) Chew ZYC	7	9	11	11	25	11	4
(Vietnam) Nguyen AT	11	11	11	11	8	11	4	(Vietnam) Nguyen AT	11	11	9	6	23	4	2
(Singapore) Pang YEK	7	13	3	9	11	4	2
