= 2022 South East Asian Table Tennis Championships – Women's doubles =

Table tennis competition

Women's doubles at the 2022 South East Asian Table Tennis Championships
- Venue: Fashion Island Hall 3rd
- Location: Bangkok, Thailand
- Date: 25–28 June
- Competitors: 24 from 6 nations

Medalists
gold medal	Suthasini Sawettabut; Orawan Paranang	Thailand
silver medal	Jinnipa Sawettabut; Wanwisa Aueawiriyayothin	Thailand
bronze medal	Karen Lyne Anak Dick; Ho Ying	Malaysia
bronze medal	Zeng Jian; Wong Xin Ru	Singapore

The women's doubles at the 2022 South East Asian Table Tennis Championships in Bangkok, Thailand was held at Fashion Island Hall 3rd from 25 to 28 June 2022.

== Schedule ==
All times are Thailand Standard Time (UTC+07:00)

Date	Time	Round
Saturday, 25 June 2022	11:30	Round of 16
Friday, 26 June 2022	14:30	Quarterfinals
Saturday, 27 June 2022	16:00	Semifinals
Sunday, 28 June 2022	11:40	Final

== Main bracket ==
Round of 16
(Philippines) AJ Laude (Philippines) KR Cruz	6	7	11	12	8	2
(Vietnam) Ngyen KDK (Vietnam) Nguyen TKM	11	11	9	10	11	3
(Thailand) J Sawettabut (Thailand) W Aueawiriyayothin	11	11	12	7	11	3
(Indonesia) DO Sugiarto (Indonesia) CM Putri	8	7	14	11	8	2
(Philippines) ER Dael (Philippines) KB Ablaza	11	6	10	12	3	2
(Indonesia) N Widarahman (Indonesia) S Aminah	4	11	12	10	11	3
(Malaysia) Tee AX (Malaysia) Im LY	3	11	14	7	1
(Vietnam) Nguyen TN (Vietnam) Tran MN	11	9	16	11	3

Quarterfinals
(Malaysia) KLA Dick (Malaysia) Ho Y	11	11	11	3
(Vietnam) Ngyen KDK (Vietnam) Nguyen TKM	8	6	9	0
(Thailand) J Sawettabut (Thailand) W Aueawiriyayothin	11	11	11	3
(Singapore) Zhou J (Singapore) Goi RX	8	6	9	0
(Singapore) Zeng J (Singapore) Wong XR	13	11	11	3
(Indonesia) N Widarahman (Indonesia) S Aminah	11	3	2	0
(Vietnam) Nguyen TN (Vietnam) Tran MN	13	12	5	0
(Thailand) S Sawettabut (Thailand) O Paranang	15	14	11	3

Semifinals
(Malaysia) KLA Dick (Malaysia) Ho Y	11	5	4	11	5	2
(Thailand) J Sawettabut (Thailand) W Aueawiriyayothin	9	11	11	6	11	3
(Singapore) Zeng J (Singapore) Wong XR	6	8	7	0
(Thailand) S Sawettabut (Thailand) O Paranang	11	11	11	3

Final
(Thailand) J Sawettabut (Thailand) W Aueawiriyayothin	9	7	8	0
(Thailand) S Sawettabut (Thailand) O Paranang	11	11	11	3
