= French Association of Sepak Takraw =

Sport governing body

- Sport: Sepaktakraw
- Abbreviation: AFST
- Founded: 2003; 23 years ago
- Affiliation: International Sepaktakraw Federation (ISTAF)
- Location: 8 Ingwiller Street, Schiltigheim, France
- President: Patrick Laemmel

Official website
- www.takrawfrance.com
- (France)

The French Association of Sepak Takraw (French: Association Française de Sepak Takraw; AFST) is the national governing body for the sport of sepaktakraw in France. Founded in 2003 by Patrick Laemmel and Franck Michel in the city of Schiltigheim, it subsequently gained membership of the Federation of European Sepak Takraw Associations (FESTA) and the International Sepaktakraw Federation (ISTAF) in 2008. The association is responsible for organizing its annual tournaments, l'Open de France and the European Sepaktakraw Championship, which was established in 2003, coordinating the domestic sepaktakraw clubs, as well as selecting players for international competitions.

The French Association of Sepak Takraw has not been recognized as the official sepaktakraw governing body by the ministry of national education, youth, and sports of France, which causes all association activities to rely on community supports. In 2019, the France national team was early expected to participate at the 34th King's Cup Sepaktakraw World Championship in Thailand, unfortunately, withdrew for undisclosed reasons.

== History ==
The modern sepaktakraw was first brought to France in Alsace during the late 90s by two French athletes, Patrick Laemmel and Franck Miche, who have a significant role in the growth of sepaktakraw in the country. Until 2008, the Federation of European Sepak Takraw Associations was established, aiming to promote and organize the continental tournament in Europe, under the regulation of the International Sepaktakraw Federation, France was included in the alliance and also competed in the tournament under the name of the French Association of Sepak Takraw (AFST). The ASFT was founded by Patrick Laemmel in 2003, its head office is located in the city of Schiltigheim, where the first registered French sepaktakraw club originated. At that time, there were six sepaktakraw clubs affiliated with the AFST including; the club of Schiltigheim, Wittenheim-Mulhouse, Évry, Les Herbiers, Toulouse, and Lille.

Within a year after the inception of the AFST, the organization subsequently launched the first its own tournament, named, l'Open de France, which was later considered as the most important sepaktakraw tournament in Europe, and the first ever in France. In the latest edition, 11th Open de France, which was held at Malteries Gymnasium of Schiltigheim, there were twelve national teams participated namely, Thailand, Malaysia, Japan, India, China, Iran, the Philippines, Germany, France, Switzerland, Belgium, and Brazil. Moreover, the AFST also conducted the European Sepaktakraw Championship in the same year, in which only the European clubs can participate; in the 2018 edition, which was being held in Toulouse, there were fifteen teams participated. Nevertheless, despite being considered as the most active sepaktakraw association in Europe, the AFST did not get any recognition as the sport governing body from the related-ministry, which causes a lack of government subsidy. The association movement usually relies on its own budget and the support of the Schiltigheim communities as well as the Mairie; that included organizing the international tournaments.

Nowadays, the number of French sepak takraw clubs is significantly increased compared to the foremost era of the AFST. Outside Paris, several clubs in Seine-Saint-Denis are affiliated with the AFST. Additionally in Essonne, Sainte-Geneviève-des-Bois, Toulouse, Lyon, Mulhouse, Nantes, Strasbourg, Schiltigheim as well as in the oversea territories, the French Guiana and Réunion. Moreover, the regional sepaktakraw association also found, such as, the Association de Sepak Takraw de Toulouse (ASTT) in Toulouse and the Association Cannoise de Sepak Takraw (ACST) in Cannes.

== Affiliated club ==
Some affiliated clubs of the French Association of Sepak Takraw was listed below;

- Association de Sepak Takraw de Toulouse (ASTT) in Toulouse.
- Filipino-French Sepak Takraw community in Paris.
- Attention Takraw Cho (ATC) in Évry.
- Association Kila Lao (AKL) in Wittenheim.
- Association Cannoise de Sepak Takraw (ACST) in Cannes

== See also ==
- International Sepaktakraw Federation
