= 2022 South East Asian Table Tennis Championships – Men's doubles =

Table tennis competition

Men's doubles at the 2022 South East Asian Table Tennis Championships
- Venue: Fashion Island Hall 3rd
- Location: Bangkok, Thailand
- Date: 25–28 June
- Competitors: 32 from 8 nations

Medalists
gold medal	Clarence Chew; Poh Shao Feng Ethan	Singapore
silver medal	Pang Yew En Koen; Quek Yong Izaac	Singapore
bronze medal	Rafanael Nikola Niman; Hafidh Nuur Annafi	Indonesia
bronze medal	Padasak Tanviriyavechakul; Sarayut Tancharoen	Thailand

The men's doubles at the 2022 South East Asian Table Tennis Championships in Bangkok, Thailand was held at Fashion Island Hall 3rd from 25 to 28 June 2022.

== Schedule ==
All times are Thailand Standard Time (UTC+07:00)

Date	Time	Round
Saturday, 25 June 2022	11:00	Round of 16
Friday, 26 June 2022	15:00	Quarterfinals
Saturday, 27 June 2022	15:20	Semifinals
Sunday, 28 June 2022	12:30	Final

== Main bracket ==
Round of 16
(Singapore) Chew ZYC (Singapore) Poh SFE	11	11	11	3
(Cambodia) Khun P (Cambodia) Bun V	7	1	2	0
(Philippines) JM Nayre (Philippines) ED Tormis	4	11	11	11	3
(Vietnam) Ngyen AT (Vietnam) Doan BTA	11	9	7	7	1
(Laos) S Vongdalasinh (Laos) P Kongphet	8	8	9	0
(Thailand) P Passara (Thailand) S Jermplang	11	11	11	3
(Indonesia) RN Niman (Indonesia) HN Annafi	11	7	11	11	3
(Malaysia) Leong CF (Malaysia) Ng WSD	7	11	7	9	1
(Thailand) P Tanviriyavechakul (Thailand) S Tancharoen	11	11	11	3
(Laos) S Mosangsinh (Laos) A Vongsa	5	8	5	0
(Cambodia) Yiv S (Cambodia) Sarak SP	11	6	10	12	3	2
(Malaysia) Wong QS (Malaysia) Choong J	4	11	12	10	11	3
(Vietnam) Le DD (Vietnam) Dinh AH	11	11	11	3
(Philippines) J Adasa (Philippines) JM Castro	6	6	6	0
(Indonesia) BM Pratikto (Indonesia) FF Fadilah	5	2	6	0
(Singapore) Pang YEK (Singapore) Quek YI	11	11	11	3

Quarterfinals
(Singapore) Chew ZYC (Singapore) Poh SFE	11	11	11	3
(Philippines) JM Nayre (Philippines) ED Tormis	7	1	2	0
(Thailand) P Passara (Thailand) S Jermplang	8	9	11	14	6	2
(Indonesia) RN Niman (Indonesia) HN Annafi	11	11	9	12	11	3
(Thailand) P Tanviriyavechakul (Thailand) S Tancharoen	9	11	7	11	11	3
(Malaysia) Wong QS (Malaysia) Choong J	11	8	11	7	8	2
(Vietnam) Le DD (Vietnam) Dinh AH	11	9	3	7	1
(Singapore) Pang YEK (Singapore) Quek YI	9	11	11	11	3

Semifinals
(Singapore) Chew ZYC (Singapore) Poh SFE	11	5	11	11	3
(Indonesia) RN Niman (Indonesia) HN Annafi	4	11	8	9	1
(Thailand) P Tanviriyavechakul (Thailand) S Tancharoen	3	3	7	0
(Singapore) Pang YEK (Singapore) Quek YI	11	11	11	3

Final
(Singapore) Chew ZYC (Singapore) Poh SFE	4	11	10	11	11	3
(Singapore) Pang YEK (Singapore) Quek YI	11	6	12	8	3	2
