= 2022 South East Asian Table Tennis Championships – Women's team =

Women's team at the 2022 South East Asian Table Tennis Championships
- Venue: Fashion Island Hall 3rd
- Location: Bangkok, Thailand
- Dates: 23–24 June
- Competitors: 29 from 6 nations

Medalists
gold medal	Suthasini Sawettabut; Orawan Paranang; Jinnipa Sawettabut; Wirakarn Tayapitak; Wanwisa Aueawiriyayothin	Thailand
silver medal	Zeng Jian; Zhou Jingyi; Goi Rui Xuan; Wong Xin Ru; Zhang Wanling	Singapore
bronze medal	Novida Widarahman; Siti Aminah; Dwi Oktaviany Sugiarto; Cindy Marcella Putri	Indonesia
bronze medal	Ho Ying; Karen Lyne Anak Dick; Tee Ai Xin; Alice Chang Li Sian; Im Li Ying	Singapore

The women's team at the 2022 South East Asian Table Tennis Championships in Bangkok, Thailand was held at Fashion Island Hall 3rd from 23 to 24 June 2022.

== Schedule ==
All times are Thailand Standard Time (UTC+07:00)

Date	Time	Round
Thursday, 23 June 2022	10:00	Group Stage
Friday, 24 June 2022	10:00	Semifinals
Friday, 24 June 2022	15:00	Finals

== Group stage ==
=== Group A ===
Pos	Team	Pld	W	L	Pts	Promotion	SGP	MAS	VIE
1	Singapore	2	2	0	4	Advance to Main Draw	—	3–1	3–1
2	Malaysia	2	1	1	3	Advance to Main Draw	1–3	—	3–1
3	Vietnam	2	0	2	2		1–3	1–3	—

Source: SEATTC - Women's team

23 June 2022; 10:00	Malaysia	3–1	Vietnam	Fashion Island Hall 3rd, Bangkok; Match 5 Table 5

23 June 2022; 14:45	Malaysia	1–3	Singapore	Fashion Island Hall 3rd, Bangkok; Match 11; Table 2

23 June 2022; 18:15	Singapore	3–1	Vietnam	Fashion Island Hall 3rd, Bangkok; Match 17; Table 1

=== Group B ===
Pos	Team	Pld	W	L	Pts	Promotion	THA	INA	PHI
1	Thailand	2	2	0	4	Advance to Main Draw	—	3–0	3–0
2	Indonesia	2	1	1	3	Advance to Main Draw	0–3	—	3–2
3	Philippines	2	0	2	2		0–3	2–3	—

Source: SEATTC - Women's team

23 June 2022; 10:00	Thailand	3–1	Indonesia	Fashion Island Hall 3rd, Bangkok; Match 6 Table 6

23 June 2022; 14:45	Thailand	3–0	Philippines	Fashion Island Hall 3rd, Bangkok; Match 12; Table 1

23 June 2022; 18:15	Philippines	2–3	Indonesia	Fashion Island Hall 3rd, Bangkok; Match 18; Table 2

== Main bracket ==
Semifinals
Singapore	3
Indonesia	0
Malaysia	1
Thailand	3

Final
Singapore	1
Thailand	3

=== Semifinals ===
24 June 2022; 10:00	Singapore	3–0	Indonesia	Fashion Island Hall 3rd, Bangkok; Match D2-1; Table 2

24 June 2022; 10:00	Malaysia	2–3	Thailand	Fashion Island Hall 3rd, Bangkok; Match D2-2; Table 1

Report	Individual matches
Karen Lyne Anak Dick	0–3	Orawan Paranang	9 – 11, 5 – 11, 3 – 11
Tee Ai Xin	0–3	Suthasini Sawettabut	7 – 11, 8 – 11, 9 – 11
Alice Chang Li Sian	3–2	Jinnipa Sawettabut	11 – 5, 11 – 3, 9 – 11, 8 – 11, 11 – 9
Karen Lyne Anak Dick	3–1	Suthasini Sawettabut	11 – 7, 11 – 6, 4 – 11, 11 – 6
Tee Ai Xin	0–3	Orawan Paranang	3 – 11, 7 – 11, 4 – 11

=== Gold-medal match ===
24 June 2022; 15:00	Singapore	1–3	Thailand	Fashion Island Hall 3rd, Bangkok; Match D2-5; Table 1

Report	Individual matches
Wong Xin Ru	0–3	Suthasini Sawettabut	7 – 11, 2 – 11, 12 – 14
Zeng Jian	2–3	Orawan Paranang	11 – 9, 9 – 11, 9 – 11, 11 – 9, 10 – 12
Zhou Jingyi	3–2	Jinnipa Sawettabut	7 – 11, 8 – 11, 11 – 6, 12 – 10, 11 – 6
Zeng Jian	2–3	Suthasini Sawettabut	8 – 11, 11 – 7, 11 – 7, 11 – 13, 9 – 11
