= 2022 South East Asian Table Tennis Championships – Women's singles =

Table tennis competition

Women's singles at the 2022 South East Asian Table Tennis Championships
- Venue: Fashion Island Hall 3rd
- Location: Bangkok, Thailand
- Date: 25–28 June
- Competitors: 30 from 7 nations

Medalists
gold medal	Suthasini Sawettabut	Thailand
silver medal	Orawan Paranang	Thailand
bronze medal	Karen Lyne Anak Dick	Malaysia
bronze medal	Jinnipa Sawettabut	Thailand

The women's singles at the 2022 South East Asian Table Tennis Championships in Bangkok, Thailand was held at Fashion Island Hall 3rd from 25 to 28 June 2022.

== Schedule ==
All times are Thailand Standard Time (UTC+07:00)

Date	Time	Round
Saturday, 25 June 2022	14:30	Group Stage
Sunday, 26 June 2022	10:30	Group Stage
Sunday, 26 June 2022	16:50	R/32
Monday, 27 June 2022	11:20	R/16
Monday, 27 June 2022	14:40	Quarterfinals
Tuesday, 28 June 2022	10:00	Semifinals
Tuesday, 28 June 2022	14:30	Final

== Group Stage ==
=== Group 1 ===
No.	Number	Group 1	1	2	3	W	L	PTS	POS
1	SGP203	(Singapore) Goi Rui Xuan	–	1:3(-8, 6, 7, 9)	3:0(2, 5, 8)	1	1	3	2
2	VIE201	(Vietnam) Nguyễn Thị Nga	3:1	–	3:0(9, 8, 3)	2	0	4	1
3	PHI204	(Philippines) Sheryl May Otanes	0:3	0:3	–	0	2	2	3

=== Group 2 ===
No.	Number	Group 2	1	2	3	W	L	PTS	POS
1	SGP204	(Singapore) Wong Xin Ru	–	1:3(7, -4, 8, 8)	3:0(9, 5, 2)	1	1	3	2
2	MAS202	(Malaysia) Karen Lyne Anak Dick	3:1	–	3:0(7, 8, 4)	2	0	4	1
3	INA201	(Indonesia) Novida Widarahman	0:3	0:3	–	0	2	2	3

=== Group 3 ===
No.	Number	Group 3	1	2	3	W	L	PTS	POS
1	THA201	(Thailand) Suthasini Sawettabut	–	3:0(7, 3, 9)	3:0(5, 5, 7)	2	0	4	1
2	MAS203	(Malaysia) Tee Ai Xin	0:3	–	3:0(9, 8, 3)	1	1	3	2
3	INA204	(Indonesia) Cindy Marcella Putri	0:3	0:3	–	0	2	2	3

=== Group 4 ===
No.	Number	Group 4	1	2	3	W	L	PTS	POS
1	SGP201	(Singapore) Zeng Jian	–	3:0(8, 9, 7)	3:0(1, 1, 5)	2	0	4	1
2	MAS205	(Malaysia) Im Li Ying	0:3	–	3:0(4, 6, 4)	1	1	3	2
3	LAO201	(Laos) Ninapha Kongphet	0:3	0:3	–	0	2	2	3

=== Group 5 ===
No.	Number	Group 5	1	2	3	W	L	PTS	POS
1	THA202	(Thailand) Orawan Paranang	–	3:0(4, 3, 4)	3:0(9, 10, 10)	2	0	4	1
2	INA203	(Indonesia) Dwi Oktaviany Sugiarto	0:3	–	3:2(15, -6, -13, 5, 9)	1	1	3	2
3	VIE205	(Vietnam) Nguyen Thuy Kieu My	0:3	2:3	–	0	2	2	3

=== Group 6 ===
No.	Number	Group 6	1	2	3	W	L	PTS	POS
1	THA203	(Thailand) Jinnipa Sawettabut	–	3:2(8, 4, -10, -7, -5)	3:0(4, 5, 6)	2	0	4	1
2	MAS201	(Malaysia) Ho Ying	2:3	–	2:3(-12, 9, -2, 7, 6)	0	2	2	3
3	PHI203	(Philippines) Emy Rose Dael	0:3	3:2	–	1	1	3	2

=== Group 7 ===
No.	Number	Group 7	1	2	3	W	L	PTS	POS
1	SGP202	(Singapore) Zhou Jingyi	–	3:1(9, 7, -5, 4)	3:1(3, 9, -7, 6)	2	0	4	1
2	PHI201	(Philippines) Kheith Rhynne Cruz	1:3	–	3:0(2, 4, 6)	1	1	3	2
3	VIE204	(Vietnam) Bui Ngoc Lan	1:3	0:3	–	0	2	2	3

=== Group 8 ===
No.	Number	Group 8	1	2	3	W	L	PTS	POS
1	SGP205	(Singapore) Zhang Wanling	–	0:3(8, 6, 3)	3:2(8, 5, -8, -7, -8)	1	1	3	3
2	THA204	(Thailand) Wirakarn Tayapitak	3:0	–	1:3(-4, 5, 6, 8)	1	1	3	1
3	VIE202	(Vietnam) Tran Mai Ngoc	2:3	3:1	–	1	1	3	2

=== Group 9 ===
No.	Number	Group 9	1	2	3	W	L	PTS	POS
1	MAS204	(Malaysia) Alice Chang Li Sian	–	3:2(-8, 5, 8, -10, 9)	0:3(9, 4, 8)	1	1	3	2
2	PHI202	(Philippines) Angelou Joyce Laude	2:3	–	2:3(5, -7, -8, 9, 4)	0	2	2	3
3	VIE203	(Vietnam) Nguyen Khoa Dieu Khanh	3:0	3:2	–	2	0	4	1

=== Group 10 ===
No.	Number	Group 10	1	2	3	W	L	PTS	POS
1	THA205	(Thailand) Wanwisa Aueawiriyayothin	–	3:1(6, -7, 4, 12)	3:0(2, 4, 2)	2	0	4	1
2	INA202	(Indonesia) Siti Aminah	1:3	–	3:0(8, 7, 9)	1	1	3	2
3	PHI205	(Philippines) Keziah Bien Ablaza	0:3	0:3	–	0	2	2	3

== Main bracket ==
=== Top Draw ===
Round of 32
(Malaysia) Chang LSA	9	10	11	4	1
(Singapore) Wong XR	11	12	4	11	3
(Philippines) KR Cruz	9	7	12	0
(Malaysia) Tee AX	11	11	14	3

Round of 16
(Vietnam) Nguyen TN	13	10	11	2	5	2
(Thailand) W Aueawiriyayothin	11	12	7	11	11	3
(Singapore) Wong XR	3	11	1	0
(Thailand) O Paranang	11	13	11	3
(Thailand) J Sawettabut	11	11	11	3
(Vietnam) Tran MN	4	3	5	0
(Malaysia) Tee AX	4	7	5	0
(Singapore) Zeng J	11	11	11	3

Quarterfinals
(Thailand) W Aueawiriyayothin	10	11	9	11	8	2
(Thailand) O Paranang	12	6	11	3	11	3
(Thailand) J Sawettabut	11	11	2	11	3
(Singapore) Zeng J	9	6	11	4	1

Semifinals
(Thailand) O Paranang	9	9	10	11	11	11	11	4
(Thailand) J Sawettabut	11	11	12	8	7	5	8	3

=== Bottom Draw ===
Round of 32
(Malaysia) Im LY	5	14	7	11	2	2
(Indonesia) S Aminah	11	12	11	5	11	3
(Indonesia) DO Sugiarto	4	5	7	0
(Singapore) GR Xuan	11	11	11	3

Round of 16
(Thailand) S Sawettabut	11	11	11	3
(Indonesia) S Aminah	2	3	2	0
(Vietnam) Nguyen KDK	8	12	10	7	1
(Singapore) Zhou J	11	10	12	11	3
(Thailand) W Tayapitak	11	11	11	3
(Singapore) Goi RX	8	4	6	0
(Philippines) ER Dael	7	9	9	0
(Malaysia) KLA Dick	11	11	11	3

Quarterfinals
(Thailand) S Sawettabut	11	11	13	3
(Singapore) Zhou J	6	5	11	0
(Thailand) W Tayapitak	7	11	10	8	1
(Malaysia) KLA Dick	11	9	12	11	3

Semifinals
(Thailand) S Sawettabut	11	11	11	11	4
(Malaysia) KLA Dick	5	5	4	5	0

== Final bracket ==
Semifinals									Final
(Thailand) O Paranang	9	9	10	11	11	11	11	4
(Thailand) J Sawettabut	11	11	12	8	7	5	8	3	(Thailand) O Paranang	14	11	10	5	8	10	2
(Thailand) S Sawettabut	11	11	11	11				4	(Thailand) S Sawettabut	12	7	12	11	11	12	4
(Malaysia) KLA Dick	5	5	4	5				0
