= 2022 South East Asian Junior and Cadet Table Tennis Championships =

Tournament details
- Dates: 17–22 June 2022
- Edition: 26th
- Venue: Fashion Island Hall 3rd
- Location: Bangkok, Thailand

The 26th South East Asian Junior and Cadet Table Tennis Championships 2022 were held in Bangkok, Thailand, from 17 to 22 June 2022.

== Medal summary ==
=== Events ===
Event	Gold	Silver	Bronze
Junior Boys' singles	Thailand; Sitisak Nuchchart	Thailand; Napat Thanmathikom	Singapore; Tan Zhao Ray
Junior Boys' singles	Thailand; Sitisak Nuchchart	Thailand; Napat Thanmathikom	Thailand; Punnatat Tungbovornphichet
Junior Girls' singles	Singapore; Tan Zhao Yun	Thailand; Wanwisa Aueawiriyayothin	Indonesia; Siti Aminah
Junior Girls' singles	Singapore; Tan Zhao Yun	Thailand; Wanwisa Aueawiriyayothin	Malaysia; Im Li Ying
Junior Boys' doubles	Thailand; Napat Thanmathikom; Sitisak Nuchchart	Malaysia; Wong Qi Shen; Tan Yi Heng	Singapore; Tan Zhao Ray; Wong Yan Kai Andy
Junior Boys' doubles	Thailand; Napat Thanmathikom; Sitisak Nuchchart	Malaysia; Wong Qi Shen; Tan Yi Heng	Thailand; Puripong Saelee; Tieanchai Saeou
Junior Girls' doubles	Thailand; Wanwisa Aueawiriyayothin; Phantita Pinyopisan	Thailand; Wirakarn Tayapitak; Thanathnan Choosattayanond	Malaysia; Lim Jing Shuen; Low Yu Xuan
Junior Girls' doubles	Thailand; Wanwisa Aueawiriyayothin; Phantita Pinyopisan	Thailand; Wirakarn Tayapitak; Thanathnan Choosattayanond	Thailand; Supamas Pankhaoyoi; Thanwarat Chantana
Junior Mixed doubles	Thailand; Napat Thanmathikom; Wanwisa Aueawiriyayothin	Thailand; Sitisak Nuchchart; Wirakarn Tayapitak	Malaysia; Tan Yi Heng; Lim Jing Shuen
Junior Mixed doubles	Thailand; Napat Thanmathikom; Wanwisa Aueawiriyayothin	Thailand; Sitisak Nuchchart; Wirakarn Tayapitak	Malaysia; Wong Qi Shen; Im Li Ying
Junior Boys' team	Thailand; Napat Thanmathikom; Puripong Saelee; Sitisak Nuchchart; Tieanchai Saeou	Singapore; Wong Yan Kai Andy; Tan Zhao Ray; Zhou Jinghe; Jayden Tan Kai Yang	Philippines; Eljay Dan Tormis; Henze Dominique Lucero; Reyan Yvess Reg; Mahendra Cabrido
Junior Boys' team	Thailand; Napat Thanmathikom; Puripong Saelee; Sitisak Nuchchart; Tieanchai Saeou	Singapore; Wong Yan Kai Andy; Tan Zhao Ray; Zhou Jinghe; Jayden Tan Kai Yang	Malaysia; Wong Qi Shen; Lee Yong Yi; Tan Yi Heng; Richard Yap Rui Zhe
Junior Girls' team	Thailand; Wanwisa Aueawiriyayothin; Phantita Pinyopisan; Wirakarn Tayapitak; Thanathnan Choosattayanond	Singapore; Ser Lin Qian; Tan Zhao Yun; Cheng Yoke Ning Janissa; Peh Gisele	Indonesia; Novida Widarahman; Siti Aminah; Dwi Oktaviany Sugiarto; Cindy Marcella Putri
Junior Girls' team	Thailand; Wanwisa Aueawiriyayothin; Phantita Pinyopisan; Wirakarn Tayapitak; Thanathnan Choosattayanond	Singapore; Ser Lin Qian; Tan Zhao Yun; Cheng Yoke Ning Janissa; Peh Gisele	Philippines; Kheith Rhynne Cruz; Althea Jade Gudes; Levee Marie Oliva; Jelaine Montecarlo
Cadet Boys' singles	Malaysia; Lai Yong Han	Singapore; Elssworth Le	Singapore; Loy Xing Yao
Cadet Boys' singles	Malaysia; Lai Yong Han	Singapore; Elssworth Le	Thailand; Nimit Soiphuang
Cadet Girls' singles	Thailand; Phatsaraphon Wonglakhon	Singapore; Loy Ming Ying	Malaysia; Gan Ai Lis
Cadet Girls' singles	Thailand; Phatsaraphon Wonglakhon	Singapore; Loy Ming Ying	Thailand; Chisa Cachamit
Cadet Boys' doubles	Singapore; Nicolas Tan; Yang Ze Yi	Singapore; Loy Xing Yao; Ellsworth Le	Malaysia; Lai Yong Han; Yew Yan Bin
Cadet Boys' doubles	Singapore; Nicolas Tan; Yang Ze Yi	Singapore; Loy Xing Yao; Ellsworth Le	Philippines; Emmanuel Paculba Jr. Gabriel Docto
Cadet Girls' doubles	Thailand; Pacharaphorn Chanvanitborikan; Chisa Cachamit	Philippines; J-ann Sanchez; Jigyasa Cabrido	Singapore; Loy Ming Ying; Chloe Lai Neng Huen
Cadet Girls' doubles	Thailand; Pacharaphorn Chanvanitborikan; Chisa Cachamit	Philippines; J-ann Sanchez; Jigyasa Cabrido	Thailand; Kulapassr Vijitviriyagul; Wiranchana Sreehak
Cadet Boys' team	Singapore; Loy Xing Yao; Ellsworth Le; Nicolas Tan; Yang Ze Yi	Malaysia; Lai Yong Han; Yew Yan Bin; Muhammad Danish Aiman; Sai Zheng Xun	Indonesia; Muhammad Alghifari; Muhammad Naufal Junindra; Christian Jehezekel Jason; Marcelino Rasya
Cadet Boys' team	Singapore; Loy Xing Yao; Ellsworth Le; Nicolas Tan; Yang Ze Yi	Malaysia; Lai Yong Han; Yew Yan Bin; Muhammad Danish Aiman; Sai Zheng Xun	Thailand; Wasaphon Yatawanon; Sittipol Aukadechchaikul; Nimit Soiphuang; Yanamatee Werasuwan
Cadet Girls' team	Singapore; Loy Ming Ying; Chloe Lai Neng Huen; Lee Eng Kee Eudora; Naomi Lum En Xi	Thailand; Khemisarar Derujijaroen; Kulapassr Vijitviriyagul; Phatsaraphon Wonglakhon; Wiranchana Sreehak	Indonesia; Afghani Faiza Zahra; Rasmi Citra; Fanelis Adisty Norma; Winata Janelle Aurellia
Cadet Girls' team	Singapore; Loy Ming Ying; Chloe Lai Neng Huen; Lee Eng Kee Eudora; Naomi Lum En Xi	Thailand; Khemisarar Derujijaroen; Kulapassr Vijitviriyagul; Phatsaraphon Wonglakhon; Wiranchana Sreehak	Malaysia; Gan Ai Lis; Joanne Chen Yu Xi; Josie Wong Min Le; Chan Jing You

=== Medal table ===
* Host nation (Thailand)

Rank	Nation	Gold	Silver	Bronze	Total
1	Thailand*	8	5	7	20
2	Singapore	4	5	4	13
3	Malaysia	1	2	8	11
4	Philippines	0	1	3	4
5	Indonesia	0	0	4	4
Totals (5 entries)		13	13	26	52

== See also ==
- 2022 World Junior Table Tennis Championships
- 2022 Asian Junior and Cadet Table Tennis Championships
- Asian Table Tennis Union
