= 2019 King's Cup Sepaktakraw World Championship =

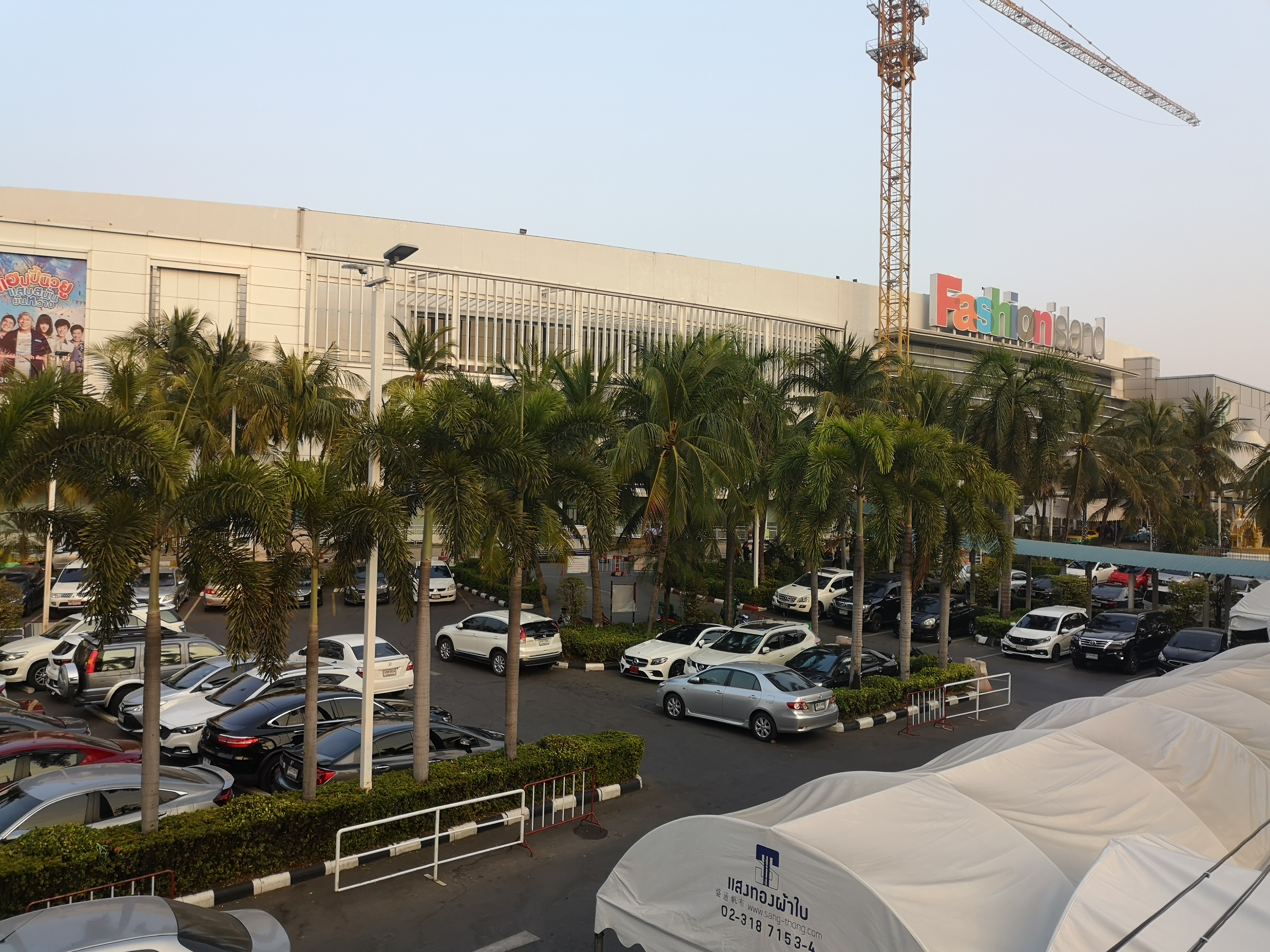
- Fashion Island Shopping Mall, the venue of the tournament

Tournament details
- Host country: Thailand
- City: Bangkok
- Dates: 25 August –1 September 2019
- Teams: 36 countries (from International Sepaktakraw confederations)
- Venue: Fashion Island

Final positions
- Champions: MD–PM: Myanmar; MD–D1: Singapore; MR–PM: Thailand; MR–D1: India; MT–PM: Thailand; MT–D1: Iran; MH–PM: Thailand; WD–PM: Myanmar; WR–PM: Thailand; WT–PM: Thailand; WH–PM: Thailand

Tournament statistics
- Matches played: 281

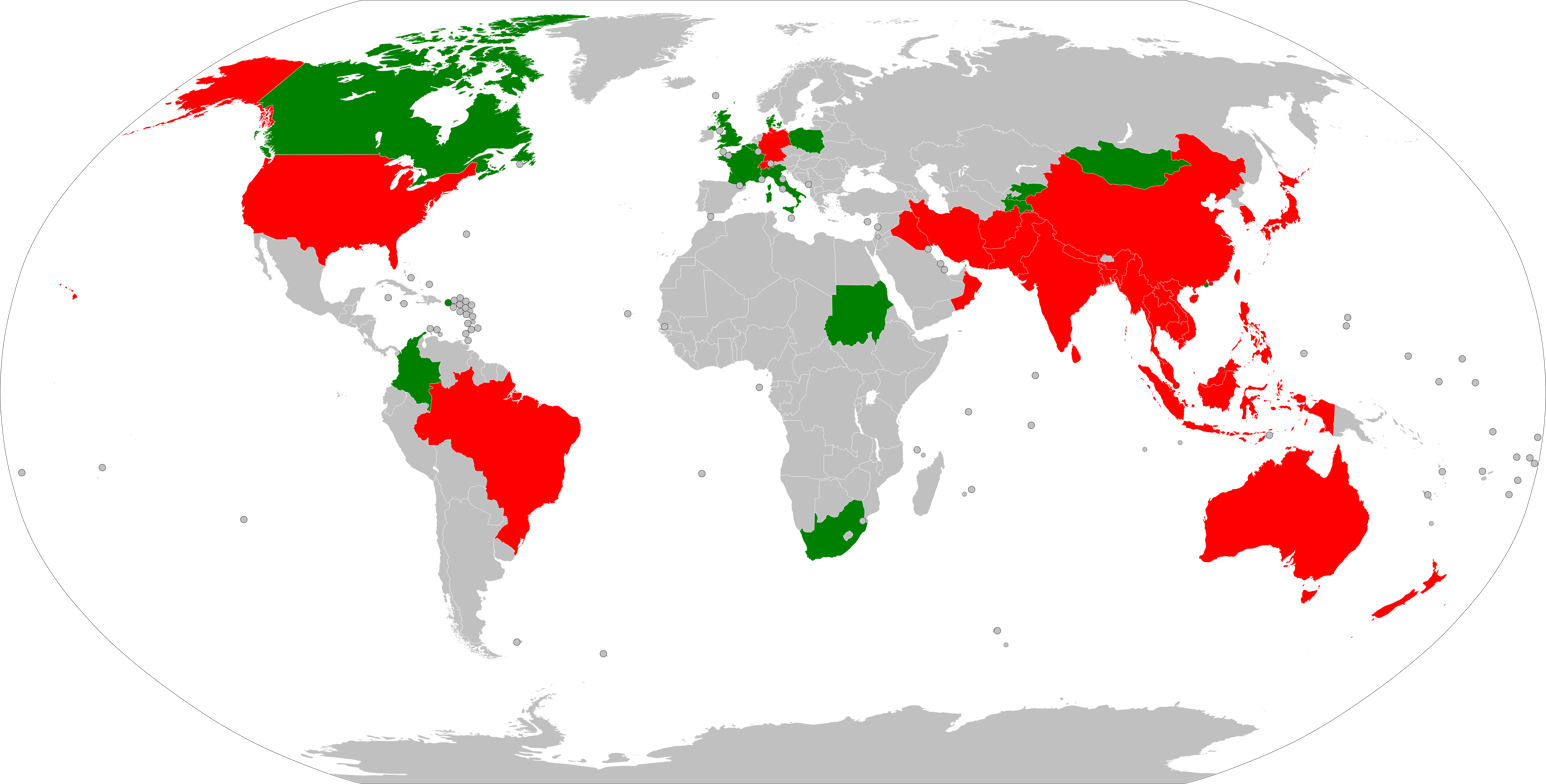
Countries that participated in the 2019 King's Cup Sepaktakraw World Championship. ISTAF membership countries that participated in the tournament. ISTAF membership countries that did not participate in the tournament. Non-ISTAF membership countries (did not participate).

The 2019 King's Cup Sepaktakraw World Championship is the 34th edition of the sepak takraw's premier tournament King's Cup World Championship, organized by the Takraw Association of Thailand and the International Sepaktakraw Federation (ISTAF), during August 25 – September 1, 2019, at Fashion Island, Bangkok. Thirty-one ISTAF's member countries with a total of more than 500 players participated in the tournament, which featured both men and women categories. The tournament was live broadcast from August 27 to September 1 on Mono 29, Mono Max, and Mono Plus, the satellite television channels in Thailand.

The tournament consists of 281 total match plays, which were divided into two divisions, namely; the Premier division (PM) and the Division 1 (D1), each division consists of 3 events, including; Double, Regu, and Team. All stated events were separated into 2 categories viz; men's and women's. However, no division 1 was assigned for the women category because of the limited quantity of women team participate. Due to the mentioned reasons, the hoop race was likewise conducted on only two events, including men's and women's, with no separated division.

Thailand was the greatest conqueror of the tournament by acquiring six gold medals from all regu and team categories in the premier division, as well as, the hoop categories, followed by Myanmar, which gained two golds from men's and women's double in the premier division. India, Iran, and Singapore, each obtained 1 gold in division 1; men regu, men team, and men double, respectively. Like the previous edition, the winner of each category in division 1 will automatically advance to the Premier Division in the forthcoming tournament.

== Participating countries ==
The Thirty-one ISTAF member associations, mostly from Asia–Oceania, are ranked and allocated into the groups based on their performance in the previous edition. The winner of each category in Division 1 of the 2018 edition was automatically placing on the Premier division. France and Macao were early expected to take part in the tournament but withdrew for undisclosed reasons. Afghanistan made its debut in this edition with the Men's Double (MD) event after becoming the ISTAF membership in early 2019. Thailand did not compete in both men's and women's doubles, in order to give others chances of winning medals.

Division		Events					
Division		Men category			Women category		
Division		Double (MD)	Regu (MR)	Team (MT)	Double (WD)	Regu (WR)	Team (WT)
Premier Division (PM)
Premier Division (PM)	Group A	Chinese Taipei; Laos; Myanmar	Australia; Singapore; Thailand	Chinese Taipei; Singapore; Thailand	Cambodia; Laos; Malaysia	Chinese Taipei; Japan; Thailand	Cambodia; Laos; Thailand
Premier Division (PM)	Group B	Brunei; Japan; Vietnam	China; Indonesia	India; Indonesia; Philippines	China; Germany; Myanmar	China; India; Vietnam	India; Japan; South Korea
Premier Division (PM)	Group C	Malaysia; South Korea; United States	Japan; Malaysia; Myanmar	Japan; Laos; South Korea	Chinese Taipei; Iraq; Japan	Indonesia; Germany; Philippines	Indonesia; Iran; Malaysia; Myanmar
Premier Division (PM)	Group D	China; Indonesia; Iran; Philippines	Brunei; South Korea; Vietnam	China; Malaysia; Myanmar	Indonesia; Iran; Pakistan; South Korea	Iraq; Malaysia; Pakistan; South Korea	China; Pakistan; Philippines; Vietnam
Division 1 (D1)
Division 1 (D1)	Group A	Australia; Bangladesh; Germany	Bangladesh; India; Pakistan	Cambodia; Hong Kong; Iran; Pakistan	No Division 1 for Women category due to the limited number of women team participate.		
Division 1 (D1)	Group B	~~France~~; Hong Kong; New Zealand; Singapore	Germany; Hong Kong; Oman; New Zealand	Australia; Bangladesh; Iraq; Oman; Sri Lanka	No Division 1 for Women category due to the limited number of women team participate.		
Division 1 (D1)	Group C	Brazil; Iraq; Oman; Sri Lanka	Brazil; Iraq; Sri Lanka; United States	—N/a	No Division 1 for Women category due to the limited number of women team participate.		
Division 1 (D1)	Group D	Afghanistan; Cambodia; Nepal; Switzerland	Chinese Taipei; Iran; Nepal; Switzerland	—N/a	No Division 1 for Women category due to the limited number of women team participate.		

Events
Men's Hoop (MH)	Women's Hoop (WH)
Brazil; Brunei; Cambodia; Germany; India; Laos; Nepal; Oman; Pakistan; Philippines; Thailand; Vietnam	Cambodia; Indonesia; Iraq; Laos; Myanmar; Philippines; Thailand; Vietnam

== Premier division ==
=== Group stage ===
==== Men's Double ====
===== Group A =====
Pos	Team	Pld	W	L	Pts	SW	SL	SR	SPW	SPL	SPR	Qualification
1	Laos	2	2	0	6	4	1	4.000	106	87	1.218	Final round
2	Myanmar	2	1	1	3	3	2	1.500	104	82	1.268	Final round
3	Chinese Taipei	2	0	2	0	0	4	0.000	43	84	0.512	

Source: "ผลการแข่งขันประจำวันที่ 25 สิงาหคม พ.ศ.2564". Takraw Association of Thailand (in Thai). August 25, 2019.

25 August; 10:15	Laos	2–1	Myanmar	Fashion Island, Bangkok
25 August; 10:15	(19–21, 21–19, 24–22); P2 Report			Fashion Island, Bangkok

25 August; 18:45	Myanmar	2–0	Chinese Taipei	Fashion Island, Bangkok
25 August; 18:45	(21–12, 21–6); P2 Report			Fashion Island, Bangkok

26 August; 10:00	Laos	2–0	Chinese Taipei	Fashion Island, Bangkok
26 August; 10:00	(21–19, 21–6); P2 Report			Fashion Island, Bangkok

===== Group B =====
Pos	Team	Pld	W	L	Pts	SW	SL	SR	SPW	SPL	SPR	Qualification
1	Japan	2	2	0	6	4	1	4.000	102	79	1.291	Final round
2	Vietnam	2	1	1	3	3	2	1.500	95	84	1.131	Final round
3	Brunei	2	0	2	0	0	4	0.000	50	84	0.595	

Source: "ผลการแข่งขันประจำวันที่ 25 สิงาหคม พ.ศ.2564". Takraw Association of Thailand (in Thai). August 25, 2019.

25 August; 11:00	Japan	2–1	Vietnam	Fashion Island, Bangkok
25 August; 11:00	(18–21, 21–13, 21–19); P2 Report			Fashion Island, Bangkok

25 August; 18:45	Vietnam	2–0	Brunei	Fashion Island, Bangkok
25 August; 18:45	(21–9, 21–15); P2 Report			Fashion Island, Bangkok

26 August; 10:00	Brunei	0–2	Japan	Fashion Island, Bangkok
26 August; 10:00	(15–21, 11–21); P2 Report			Fashion Island, Bangkok

===== Group C =====
Pos	Team	Pld	W	L	Pts	SW	SL	SR	SPW	SPL	SPR	Qualification
1	South Korea	2	2	0	6	4	1	4.000	100	76	1.316	Final round
2	Malaysia	2	1	1	3	3	2	1.500	95	78	1.218	Final round
3	United States	2	0	2	0	0	4	0.000	43	84	0.512	

Source: "ผลการแข่งขันประจำวันที่ 25 สิงาหคม พ.ศ.2564". Takraw Association of Thailand (in Thai). August 25, 2019.

25 August; 16:30	South Korea	2–1	Malaysia	Fashion Island, Bangkok
25 August; 16:30	(21–16, 16–21, 21–16); P2 Report			Fashion Island, Bangkok

25 August; 19:30	Malaysia	2–0	United States	Fashion Island, Bangkok
25 August; 19:30	(21–9, 21–11); P2 Report			Fashion Island, Bangkok

26 August; 10:45	United States	0–2	South Korea	Fashion Island, Bangkok
26 August; 10:45	(13–21, 10–21); P2 Report			Fashion Island, Bangkok

===== Group D =====
Pos	Team	Pld	W	L	Pts	SW	SL	SR	SPW	SPL	SPR	Qualification
1	Indonesia	3	3	0	9	6	1	6.000	133	111	1.198	Final round
2	Philippines	3	2	1	6	5	2	2.500	141	80	1.763	Final round
3	China	3	1	2	3	2	4	0.500	90	107	0.841	
4	Iran	3	0	3	0	0	6	0.000	60	126	0.476	

Source: "ผลการแข่งขันประจำวันที่ 25 สิงาหคม พ.ศ.2564". Takraw Association of Thailand (in Thai). August 25, 2019.

25 August; 11:00	China	0–2	Indonesia	Fashion Island, Bangkok
25 August; 11:00	(14–21, 16–21); P2 Report			Fashion Island, Bangkok

25 August; 11:45	Iran	0–2	Philippines	Fashion Island, Bangkok
25 August; 11:45	(6–21, 7–21); P2 Report			Fashion Island, Bangkok

25 August; 19:30	Indonesia	2–0	Iran	Fashion Island, Bangkok
25 August; 19:30	(21–13, 21–11); P2 Report			Fashion Island, Bangkok

25 August; 20:15	China	0–2	Philippines	Fashion Island, Bangkok
25 August; 20:15	(7–21, 11–21); P2 Report			Fashion Island, Bangkok

26 August; 11:30	China	2–0	Iran	Fashion Island, Bangkok
26 August; 11:30	(21–11, 21–12); P2 Report			Fashion Island, Bangkok

26 August; 10:45	Indonesia	2–1	Philippines	Fashion Island, Bangkok
26 August; 10:45	(7–21, 21–18, 21–18); P2 Report			Fashion Island, Bangkok

==== Men's Regu ====
===== Group A =====
Pos	Team	Pld	W	L	Pts	SW	SL	SR	SPW	SPL	SPR	Qualification
1	Thailand	2	2	0	6	4	0	MAX	84	31	2.710	Final round
2	Singapore	2	1	1	3	2	2	1.000	51	74	0.689	Final round
3	Australia	2	0	2	0	0	4	0.000	54	84	0.643	

Source: "ผลการแข่งขันประจำวันที่ 25 สิงาหคม พ.ศ.2564". Takraw Association of Thailand (in Thai). August 25, 2019.

27 August; 13:15	Thailand	2–0	Singapore	Fashion Island, Bangkok
27 August; 13:15	(21–4, 21–5); P2 Report			Fashion Island, Bangkok

27 August; 15:30	Australia	0–2	Singapore	Fashion Island, Bangkok
27 August; 15:30	(18–21, 14–21); P2 Report			Fashion Island, Bangkok

28 August; 10:45	Thailand	2–0	Australia	Fashion Island, Bangkok
28 August; 10:45	(21–12, 21–10); P2 Report			Fashion Island, Bangkok

===== Group B =====
Pos	Team	Pld	W	L	Pts	SW	SL	SR	SPW	SPL	SPR	Qualification
1	Indonesia	2	2	0	6	4	0	MAX	84	47	1.787	Final round
2	China	2	0	2	0	0	4	0.000	47	84	0.560	Final round

Source: "ผลการแข่งขันประจำวันที่ 28 สิงหาคม พ.ศ.2562". Takraw Association of Thailand (in Thai). August 28, 2019.

27 August; 13:15	Indonesia	2–0	China	Fashion Island, Bangkok
27 August; 13:15	(21–12, 21–14); P2 Report			Fashion Island, Bangkok

28 August; 10:45	China	0–2	Indonesia	Fashion Island, Bangkok
28 August; 10:45	(10–21, 11–21); P2 Report			Fashion Island, Bangkok

===== Group C =====
Pos	Team	Pld	W	L	Pts	SW	SL	SR	SPW	SPL	SPR	Qualification
1	Malaysia	2	2	0	6	4	0	MAX	84	45	1.867	Final round
2	Myanmar	4	1	3	4	2	2	1.000	69	64	1.078	Final round
3	Japan	3	0	3	2	0	4	0.000	40	84	0.476	

Source: "ผลการแข่งขันประจำวันที่ 28 สิงหาคม พ.ศ.2562". Takraw Association of Thailand (in Thai). August 28, 2019.

27 August; 13:15	Malaysia	2–0	Myanmar	Fashion Island, Bangkok
27 August; 13:15	(21–16, 21–11); P2 Report			Fashion Island, Bangkok

27 August; 15:30	Myanmar	2–0	Japan	Fashion Island, Bangkok
27 August; 15:30	(21–12, 21–10); P2 Report			Fashion Island, Bangkok

28 August; 11:30	Japan	0–2	Malaysia	Fashion Island, Bangkok
28 August; 11:30	(8–21, 10–21); P2 Report			Fashion Island, Bangkok

===== Group D =====
Pos	Team	Pld	W	L	Pts	SW	SL	SR	SPW	SPL	SPR	Qualification
1	South Korea	3	2	1	7	4	0	MAX	84	49	1.714	Final round
2	Vietnam	4	1	3	5	2	2	1.000	71	65	1.092	Final round
3	Brunei	2	0	2	0	0	4	0.000	43	84	0.512	

Source: "ผลการแข่งขันประจำวันที่ 28 สิงหาคม พ.ศ.2564". Takraw Association of Thailand (in Thai). August 28, 2019.

27 August; 13:15	South Korea	2–0	Brunei	Fashion Island, Bangkok
27 August; 13:15	(21–5, 21–15); P2 Report			Fashion Island, Bangkok

27 August; 16:15	Brunei	0–2	Vietnam	Fashion Island, Bangkok
27 August; 16:15	(11–21, 12–21); P2 Report			Fashion Island, Bangkok

28 August; 11:30	Vietnam	0–2	South Korea	Fashion Island, Bangkok
28 August; 11:30	(11–21, 18–21); P2 Report			Fashion Island, Bangkok

==== Women's Double ====
===== Group A =====
Pos	Team	Pld	W	L	Pts	SW	SL	SR	SPW	SPL	SPR	Qualification
1	Laos	2	2	0	6	4	0	MAX	84	27	3.111	Final round
2	Malaysia	2	1	1	3	2	2	1.000	53	66	0.803	Final round
3	Cambodia	2	0	2	0	0	4	0.000	40	84	0.476	

Source: "ผลการแข่งขันประจำวันที่ 25 สิงาหคม พ.ศ.2564". Takraw Association of Thailand (in Thai). August 25, 2019.

25 August; 11:45	Laos	2–0	Malaysia	Fashion Island, Bangkok
25 August; 11:45	(21–5, 21–6); P2 Report			Fashion Island, Bangkok

25 August; 20:15	Malaysia	2–0	Cambodia	Fashion Island, Bangkok
25 August; 20:15	(21–10, 21–14); P2 Report			Fashion Island, Bangkok

26 August; 11:30	Laos	2–0	Cambodia	Fashion Island, Bangkok
26 August; 11:30	(21–8, 21–8); P2 Report			Fashion Island, Bangkok

===== Group B =====
Pos	Team	Pld	W	L	Pts	SW	SL	SR	SPW	SPL	SPR	Qualification
1	Myanmar	2	2	0	6	4	0	MAX	84	40	2.100	Final round
2	China	2	1	1	3	2	2	1.000	70	54	1.296	Final round
3	Germany	2	0	2	0	0	4	0.000	24	84	0.286	

Source: "ผลการแข่งขันประจำวันที่ 25 สิงาหคม พ.ศ.2564". Takraw Association of Thailand (in Thai). August 25, 2019.

25 August; 16:30	Myanmar	2–0	China	Fashion Island, Bangkok
25 August; 16:30	(21–15, 21–13); P2 Report			Fashion Island, Bangkok

25 August; 21:00	China	2–0	Germany	Fashion Island, Bangkok
25 August; 21:00	(21–3, 21–9); P2 Report			Fashion Island, Bangkok

26 August; 11:30	Myanmar	2–0	Germany	Fashion Island, Bangkok
26 August; 11:30	(21–4, 21–8); P2 Report			Fashion Island, Bangkok

===== Group C =====
Pos	Team	Pld	W	L	Pts	SW	SL	SR	SPW	SPL	SPR	Qualification
1	Japan	2	2	0	6	4	0	MAX	84	35	2.400	Final round
2	Chinese Taipei	2	1	1	3	2	2	1.000	64	66	0.970	Final round
3	Iraq	2	0	2	0	0	4	0.000	37	84	0.440	

Source: "ผลการแข่งขันประจำวันที่ 25 สิงาหคม พ.ศ.2564". Takraw Association of Thailand (in Thai). August 25, 2019.

25 August; 12:30	Japan	2–0	Chinese Taipei	Fashion Island, Bangkok
25 August; 12:30	(21–16, 21–6); P2 Report			Fashion Island, Bangkok

25 August; 21:00	Chinese Taipei	2–0	Iraq	Fashion Island, Bangkok
25 August; 21:00	(21–14, 21–10); P2 Report			Fashion Island, Bangkok

26 August; 11:30	Japan	2–0	Iraq	Fashion Island, Bangkok
26 August; 11:30	(21–8, 21–5); P2 Report			Fashion Island, Bangkok

===== Group D =====
Pos	Team	Pld	W	L	Pts	SW	SL	SR	SPW	SPL	SPR	Qualification
1	Indonesia	3	3	0	9	6	1	6.000	136	89	1.528	Final round
2	South Korea	3	2	1	6	5	2	2.500	138	81	1.704	Final round
3	Iran	3	1	2	3	2	4	0.500	80	102	0.784	
4	Pakistan	3	0	3	0	0	6	0.000	44	126	0.349	

Source: "ผลการแข่งขันประจำวันที่ 25 สิงาหคม พ.ศ.2564". Takraw Association of Thailand (in Thai). August 25, 2019.

25 August; 12:30	South Korea	1–2	Indonesia	Fashion Island, Bangkok
25 August; 12:30	(21–10, 18–21, 15–21); P2 Report			Fashion Island, Bangkok

25 August; 13:15	Iran	2–0	Pakistan	Fashion Island, Bangkok
25 August; 13:15	(21–14, 21–4); P2 Report			Fashion Island, Bangkok

25 August; 21:45	South Korea	2–0	Iran	Fashion Island, Bangkok
25 August; 21:45	(21–6, 21–9); P2 Report			Fashion Island, Bangkok

26 August; 21:45	Indonesia	2–0	Pakistan	Fashion Island, Bangkok
26 August; 21:45	(21–3, 21–9); P2 Report			Fashion Island, Bangkok

26 August; 12:15	South Korea	2–0	Pakistan	Fashion Island, Bangkok
26 August; 12:15	(21–7, 21–7); P2 Report			Fashion Island, Bangkok

26 August; 12:15	Indonesia	2–0	Iran	Fashion Island, Bangkok
26 August; 12:15	(21–12, 21–11); P2 Report			Fashion Island, Bangkok

==== Women's Regu ====
===== Group A =====
Pos	Team	Pld	W	L	Pts	SW	SL	SR	SPW	SPL	SPR	Qualification
1	Thailand	2	2	0	6	4	0	MAX	84	30	2.800	Final round
2	Japan	2	1	1	3	2	2	1.000	62	66	0.939	Final round
3	Chinese Taipei	2	0	2	0	0	4	0.000	32	84	0.381	

Source: "ผลการแข่งขันประจำวันที่ 28 สิงหาคม พ.ศ.2562". Takraw Association of Thailand (in Thai). August 25, 2019.

27 August; 11:45	Thailand	2–0	Japan	Fashion Island, Bangkok
27 August; 11:45	(21–10, 21–12); P2 Report			Fashion Island, Bangkok

27 August; 16:15	Japan	2–0	Chinese Taipei	Fashion Island, Bangkok
27 August; 16:15	(21–10, 21–14); P2 Report			Fashion Island, Bangkok

28 August; 10:00	Chinese Taipei	0–2	Thailand	Fashion Island, Bangkok
28 August; 10:00	(21–4, 21–4); P2 Report			Fashion Island, Bangkok

===== Group B =====
Pos	Team	Pld	W	L	Pts	SW	SL	SR	SPW	SPL	SPR	Qualification
1	Vietnam	2	2	0	6	4	0	MAX	84	40	2.100	Final round
2	India	2	1	1	3	2	2	1.000	64	76	0.842	Final round
3	China	2	0	2	0	0	4	0.000	52	84	0.619	

Source: "ผลการแข่งขันประจำวันที่ 28 สิงหาคม พ.ศ.2562". Takraw Association of Thailand (in Thai). August 25, 2019.

27 August; 11:45	Vietnam	2–0	China	Fashion Island, Bangkok
27 August; 11:45	(21–8, 21–10); P2 Report			Fashion Island, Bangkok

27 August; 16:15	China	0–2	India	Fashion Island, Bangkok
27 August; 16:15	(18–21, 16–21); P2 Report			Fashion Island, Bangkok

28 August; 10:00	India	0–2	Vietnam	Fashion Island, Bangkok
28 August; 10:00	(12–21, 10–21); P2 Report			Fashion Island, Bangkok

===== Group C =====
Pos	Team	Pld	W	L	Pts	SW	SL	SR	SPW	SPL	SPR	Qualification
1	Indonesia	2	2	0	6	4	0	MAX	84	33	2.545	Final round
2	Philippines	2	1	1	3	2	2	1.000	60	60	1.000	Final round
3	Germany	2	0	2	0	0	4	0.000	33	84	0.393	

Source: "ผลการแข่งขันประจำวันที่ 28 สิงหาคม พ.ศ.2562". Takraw Association of Thailand (in Thai). August 25, 2019.

27 August; 12:30	Indonesia	2–0	Philippines	Fashion Island, Bangkok
27 August; 12:30	(21–8, 21–10); P2 Report			Fashion Island, Bangkok

27 August; 16:15	Germany	0–2	Indonesia	Fashion Island, Bangkok
27 August; 16:15	(6–21, 9–21); P2 Report			Fashion Island, Bangkok

28 August; 10:00	Philippines	2–0	Germany	Fashion Island, Bangkok
28 August; 10:00	(21–9, 21–9); P2 Report			Fashion Island, Bangkok

===== Group D =====
Pos	Team	Pld	W	L	Pts	SW	SL	SR	SPW	SPL	SPR	Qualification
1	South Korea	3	3	0	9	6	0	MAX	84	43	1.953	Final round
2	Malaysia	3	2	1	6	4	2	2.000	63	64	0.984	Final round
3	Iraq	3	1	2	3	2	5	0.400	75	95	0.789	
4	Pakistan	3	0	3	0	1	6	0.167	75	105	0.714	

Source: "ผลการแข่งขันประจำวันที่ 28 สิงหาคม พ.ศ.2562". Takraw Association of Thailand (in Thai). August 25, 2019.

27 August; 12:30	South Korea	2–0	Malaysia	Fashion Island, Bangkok
27 August; 12:30	(21–12, 21–9); P2 Report			Fashion Island, Bangkok

27 August; 12:30	Pakistan	1–2	Iraq	Fashion Island, Bangkok
27 August; 12:30	(13–21, 23–21, 17–21); P2 Report			Fashion Island, Bangkok

27 August; 17:00	South Korea	2–0	Pakistan	Fashion Island, Bangkok
27 August; 17:00	P2 Report			Fashion Island, Bangkok

27 August; 17:00	Malaysia	2–0	Iraq	Fashion Island, Bangkok
27 August; 17:00	P2 Report			Fashion Island, Bangkok

28 August; 10:45	South Korea	2–0	Iraq	Fashion Island, Bangkok
28 August; 10:45	(21–12, 21–10); P2 Report			Fashion Island, Bangkok

28 August; 10:45	Malaysia	2–0	Pakistan	Fashion Island, Bangkok
28 August; 10:45	(21–12, 21–10); P2 Report			Fashion Island, Bangkok

=== Final round ===
==== Men's Double ====
Quarterfinal
A1	Laos	17	25	21	2
B2	Vietnam	21	23	9	1
C1	South Korea	21	21	–	2
D2	Philippines	18	19	–	0
B1	Japan	17	21	12	1
A2	Myanmar	21	17	21	2
D1	Indonesia	21	19	22	1
C2	Malaysia	18	21	24	2

Semifinal
A1	Laos
C1	South Korea
A2	Myanmar
C2	Malaysia

Final
C1	South Korea	8	20	–	0
A2	Myanmar	21	22	–	2

Men's Double Premier Division
2019 King's Cup Sepaktakraw World Championship

Myanmar
First title

==== Men's Regu ====
Quarterfinal
A1	Thailand	21	21	–	2
B2	China	9	8	–	0
C1	Malaysia	21	21	–	2
D2	Vietnam	10	11	–	0
B1	Indonesia	21	21	–	2
A2	Singapore	13	12	–	0
D1	South Korea	14	21	21	2
C2	Myanmar	21	8	17	1

Semifinal
A1	Thailand	21	21	–	2
C1	Malaysia	14	15	–	0
B1	Indonesia	21	21	–	2
D1	South Korea	18	14	–	0

Final
A1	Thailand	21	21	–	2
B1	Indonesia	16	16	–	0

Men's Regu Premier Division
2019 King's Cup Sepaktakraw World Championship

Thailand
Thirty-first title

==== Men's team ====
Quarterfinal
A1	Thailand	2	2	–	2
B2	Philippines	0	0	–	0
C1	South Korea	2	1	1	1
D2	Myanmar	0	2	2	2
B1	Indonesia	2	2	–	2
A2	Singapore	0	0	–	0
D1	Malaysia	2	2	–	2
C2	Laos	0	0	–	0

Semifinal
A1	Thailand	2	2	–	2
D2	Myanmar	0	0	–	0
B1	Indonesia	2	0	2	2
D1	Malaysia	0	2	0	1

Final
A1	Thailand	1	2	2	2
B1	Indonesia	2	0	0	1

Men's Team Premier Division
2019 King's Cup Sepaktakraw World Championship

Thailand
Thirty-second title

==== Women's Double ====
Quarterfinal
A1	Laos	21	21	–	2
B2	China	11	14	–	0
C1	Japan	11	9	–	0
D2	South Korea	21	21	–	2
B1	Myanmar	21	21	–	2
A2	Malaysia	8	8	–	0
D1	Indonesia	21	21	–	2
C2	Taiwan	12	12	–	0

Semifinal
A1	Laos
D2	South Korea
B1	Myanmar
D1	Indonesia

Final
A1	Laos	13	18	–	0
B1	Myanmar	21	21	–	2

Women's Double Premier Division
2019 King's Cup Sepaktakraw World Championship

Myanmar
First title

==== Women's Regu ====
Quarterfinal
A1	Thailand	21	21	–	2
B2	India	8	4	–	0
C1	Indonesia	21	21	–	2
D2	Malaysia	8	10	–	0
B1	Vietnam	21	21	–	2
A2	Japan	10	13	–	0
D1	South Korea	21	21	–	2
C2	Philippines	15	12	–	0

Semifinal
A1	Thailand	21	21	–	2
C1	Indonesia	13	9	–	0
B1	Vietnam	21	21	–	2
D1	South Korea	–	0

Final
A1	Thailand	22	21	–	2
B1	Vietnam	20	18	–	0

Women's Regu Premier Division
2019 King's Cup Sepaktakraw World Championship

Thailand
Third title

==== Women's team ====
Quarterfinal
A1	Thailand	2	2	–	2
B2	Japan	0	0	–	0
C1	Indonesia	2	2	–	2
D2	Philippines	0	0	–	0
B1	South Korea	2	2	–	2
A2	Laos	0	0	–	0
D1	Vietnam	2	2	–	2
C2	Malaysia	0	0	–	0

Semifinal
A1	Thailand	2	2	–	2
C1	Indonesia	0	0	–	0
B1	South Korea	1	0	–	1
D1	Vietnam	2	2	–	2

Final
A1	Thailand	2	2	–	2
B1	Vietnam	0	1	–	0

Women's Team Premier Division
2019 King's Cup Sepaktakraw World Championship

Thailand
Twenty-first title

== Division 1 ==
=== Group stage ===
==== Men's Double ====
===== Group A =====
Pos	Team	Pld	W	L	Pts	SW	SL	SR	SPW	SPL	SPR	Qualification
1	Australia	2	1	1	3	3	1	3.000	89	85	1.047	Final round
2	Bangladesh	2	1	1	3	2	2	1.000	77	73	1.055	
3	Germany	2	1	1	3	2	3	0.667	81	89	0.910	

Source: "ผลการแข่งขันประจำวันที่ 25 สิงาหคม พ.ศ.2564". Takraw Association of Thailand (in Thai). August 25, 2019.

25 August; 8:00	Australia	2–0	Bangladesh	Fashion Island, Bangkok
25 August; 8:00	(21–17, 21–18); P2 Report			Fashion Island, Bangkok

25 August; 13:15	Bangladesh	2–0	Germany	Fashion Island, Bangkok
25 August; 13:15	(21–12, 21–19); P2 Report			Fashion Island, Bangkok

26 August; 12:15	Australia	1–2	Germany	Fashion Island, Bangkok
26 August; 12:15	(21–8, 13–21, 13–21); P2 Report			Fashion Island, Bangkok

===== Group B =====
Pos	Team	Pld	W	L	Pts	SW	SL	SR	SPW	SPL	SPR	Qualification
1	Singapore	3	3	0	9	6	0	MAX	126	45	2.800	Final round
2	New Zealand	3	2	1	6	4	2	2.000	106	71	1.493	
3	Hong Kong	3	1	2	3	2	4	0.500	94	84	1.119	
4	France	3	0	3	0	0	6	0.000	0	126	0.000	Withdrawn

Source: "ผลการแข่งขันประจำวันที่ 25 สิงาหคม พ.ศ.2564". Takraw Association of Thailand (in Thai). August 25, 2019.

25 August; 08:00	Hong Kong	0–2	New Zealand	Fashion Island, Bangkok
25 August; 08:00	(15–21, 14–21); P2 Report			Fashion Island, Bangkok

25 August; 08:45	Singapore	2–0	France	Fashion Island, Bangkok
25 August; 08:45	(21–0, 21–0); P2 Report			Fashion Island, Bangkok

25 August; 14:00	Hong Kong	0–2	Singapore	Fashion Island, Bangkok
25 August; 14:00	(11–21, 12–21); P2 Report			Fashion Island, Bangkok

25 August; 14:00	France	0–2	New Zealand	Fashion Island, Bangkok
25 August; 14:00	(0–21, 0–21); P2 Report			Fashion Island, Bangkok

26 August; 12:15	Hong Kong	2–0	France	Fashion Island, Bangkok
26 August; 12:15	(21–0, 21–0); P2 Report			Fashion Island, Bangkok

26 August; 12:15	New Zealand	0–2	Singapore	Fashion Island, Bangkok
26 August; 12:15	(10–21, 12–21); P2 Report			Fashion Island, Bangkok

===== Group C =====
Pos	Team	Pld	W	L	Pts	SW	SL	SR	SPW	SPL	SPR	Qualification
1	Oman	3	3	0	9	6	1	6.000	132	99	1.333	Final round
2	Brazil	3	2	1	6	5	2	2.500	135	68	1.985	
3	Sri Lanka	3	1	2	3	2	4	0.500	86	117	0.735	
4	Iraq	3	0	3	0	0	6	0.000	57	126	0.452	

Source: "ผลการแข่งขันประจำวันที่ 25 สิงาหคม พ.ศ.2564". Takraw Association of Thailand (in Thai). August 25, 2019.

25 August; 08:45	Brazil	2–0	Iraq	Fashion Island, Bangkok
25 August; 08:45	(21–0, 21–0); P2 Report			Fashion Island, Bangkok

25 August; 09:30	Oman	2–0	Sri Lanka	Fashion Island, Bangkok
25 August; 09:30	(21–10, 21–14); P2 Report			Fashion Island, Bangkok

25 August; 17:15	Brazil	2–0	Sri Lanka	Fashion Island, Bangkok
25 August; 17:15	(21–10, 21–10); P2 Report			Fashion Island, Bangkok

25 August; 17:15	Iraq	0–2	Oman	Fashion Island, Bangkok
25 August; 17:15	(14–21, 10–21); P2 Report			Fashion Island, Bangkok

26 August; 13:00	Brazil	1–2	Oman	Fashion Island, Bangkok
26 August; 13:00	(15–21, 21–6, 15, 21); P2 Report			Fashion Island, Bangkok

26 August; 13:00	Iraq	0–2	Sri Lanka	Fashion Island, Bangkok
26 August; 13:00	(18–21, 15–21); P2 Report			Fashion Island, Bangkok

===== Group D =====
Pos	Team	Pld	W	L	Pts	SW	SL	SR	SPW	SPL	SPR	Qualification
1	Cambodia	3	3	0	9	6	0	MAX	126	46	2.739	Final round
2	Nepal	3	2	1	6	4	2	2.000	112	79	1.418	
3	Switzerland	3	1	2	3	2	4	0.500	97	84	1.155	
4	Afghanistan	3	0	3	0	0	6	0.000	0	126	0.000	

Source: "ผลการแข่งขันประจำวันที่ 25 สิงาหคม พ.ศ.2564". Takraw Association of Thailand (in Thai). August 25, 2019.

25 August; 09:30	Cambodia	2–0	Nepal	Fashion Island, Bangkok
25 August; 09:30	(21–14, 21–14); P2 Report			Fashion Island, Bangkok

25 August; 10:15	Afghanistan	0–2	Switzerland	Fashion Island, Bangkok
25 August; 10:15	(0–21, 0–21); P2 Report			Fashion Island, Bangkok

25 August; 18:00	Afghanistan	0–2	Cambodia	Fashion Island, Bangkok
25 August; 18:00	(0–21, 0–21); P2 Report			Fashion Island, Bangkok

25 August; 18:00	Nepal	2–0	Switzerland	Fashion Island, Bangkok
25 August; 18:00	(21–18, 21–19); P2 Report			Fashion Island, Bangkok

26 August; 13:00	Cambodia	2–0	Switzerland	Fashion Island, Bangkok
26 August; 13:00	(21–9, 21–9); P2 Report			Fashion Island, Bangkok

26 August; 13:45	Afghanistan	0–2	Nepal	Fashion Island, Bangkok
26 August; 13:45	(0–21, 0–21); P2 Report			Fashion Island, Bangkok

==== Men's Regu ====
===== Group A =====
Pos	Team	Pld	W	L	Pts	SW	SL	SR	SPW	SPL	SPR	Qualification
1	India	1	1	0	3	2	0	MAX	42	22	1.909	Final round
2	Bangladesh	1	0	1	0	0	2	0.000	22	42	0.524	
3	Pakistan	0	0	0	0	0	0	—	0	0	—	

Source: "ผลการแข่งขันประจำวันที่ 26 สิงหาคม พ.ศ.2564". Takraw Association of Thailand (in Thai). August 26, 2019.

26 August; 15:15	India	2–0	Bangladesh	Fashion Island, Bangkok
26 August; 15:15	(21–9, 21–13); P2 Report			Fashion Island, Bangkok

27 August; 14:00	Bangladesh	v	Pakistan	Fashion Island, Bangkok

27 August; 17:00	India	v	Pakistan	Fashion Island, Bangkok

===== Group B =====
Pos	Team	Pld	W	L	Pts	SW	SL	SR	SPW	SPL	SPR	Qualification
1	New Zealand	1	1	0	3	2	0	MAX	42	9	4.667	Final round
2	Oman	1	1	0	3	2	0	MAX	42	29	1.448	
3	Germany	1	0	1	0	0	2	0.000	29	42	0.690	
4	Hong Kong	1	0	1	0	0	2	0.000	9	42	0.214	

Source: "ผลการแข่งขันประจำวันที่ 25 สิงาหคม พ.ศ.2564". Takraw Association of Thailand (in Thai). August 25, 2019.

26 August; 15:15	Oman	2–0	Germany	Fashion Island, Bangkok
26 August; 15:15	(21–15, 21–14); P2 Report			Fashion Island, Bangkok

26 August; 15:15	Hong Kong	0–2	New Zealand	Fashion Island, Bangkok
26 August; 15:15	(8–21, 5–21); P2 Report			Fashion Island, Bangkok

27 August; 14:45	Oman	v	Hong Kong	Fashion Island, Bangkok

27 August; 14:45	Germany	v	New Zealand	Fashion Island, Bangkok

27 August; 17:45	Oman	v	New Zealand	Fashion Island, Bangkok

27 August; 17:45	Germany	v	Hong Kong	Fashion Island, Bangkok

===== Group C =====
Pos	Team	Pld	W	L	Pts	SW	SL	SR	SPW	SPL	SPR	Qualification
1	United States	1	1	0	3	2	0	MAX	42	24	1.750	Final round
2	Sri Lanka	1	1	0	3	2	0	MAX	42	31	1.355	
3	Iraq	1	0	1	0	0	2	0.000	31	42	0.738	
4	Brazil	1	0	1	0	0	2	0.000	24	42	0.571	

Source: "ผลการแข่งขันประจำวันที่ 25 สิงาหคม พ.ศ.2564". Takraw Association of Thailand (in Thai). August 25, 2019.

26 August; 16:00	Brazil	0–2	United States	Fashion Island, Bangkok
26 August; 16:00	(16–21, 8–21); P2 Report			Fashion Island, Bangkok

26 August; 16:00	Iraq	0–2	Sri Lanka	Fashion Island, Bangkok
26 August; 16:00	(15–21, 16–21); P2 Report			Fashion Island, Bangkok

27 August; 14:45	Brazil	v	Iraq	Fashion Island, Bangkok

27 August; 14:45	United States	v	Sri Lanka	Fashion Island, Bangkok

27 August; 17:45	Brazil	v	Sri Lanka	Fashion Island, Bangkok

27 August; 17:45	United States	v	Iraq	Fashion Island, Bangkok

===== Group D =====
Pos	Team	Pld	W	L	Pts	SW	SL	SR	SPW	SPL	SPR	Qualification
1	Chinese Taipei	1	0	1	0	0	2	0.000	24	42	0.571	Final round
2	Nepal	1	1	0	3	2	0	MAX	42	31	1.355	
3	Switzerland	1	1	0	3	2	0	MAX	42	24	1.750	
4	Iran	1	0	1	0	0	2	0.000	31	42	0.738	

Source: "ผลการแข่งขันประจำวันที่ 25 สิงาหคม พ.ศ.2564". Takraw Association of Thailand (in Thai). August 25, 2019.

26 August; 16:00	Chinese Taipei	2–0	Switzerland	Fashion Island, Bangkok
26 August; 16:00	(21–15, 21–11); P2 Report			Fashion Island, Bangkok

26 August; 16:00	Iran	2–1	Nepal	Fashion Island, Bangkok
26 August; 16:00	(21–14, 18–21, 21–15); P2 Report			Fashion Island, Bangkok

27 August; 15:30	Chinese Taipei	v	Iran	Fashion Island, Bangkok

27 August; 15:30	Switzerland	v	Nepal	Fashion Island, Bangkok

27 August; 18:30	Chinese Taipei	v	Nepal	Fashion Island, Bangkok

27 August; 18:30	Switzerland	v	Iran	Fashion Island, Bangkok

=== Final Round ===
==== Men's Double ====
Semifinal
A1	Australia	12	15	0
B1	Singapore	21	21	2
Date: 27 August, 11:00
C1	Oman	18	13	0
D1	Cambodia	21	21	2

Final
A1	Singapore	21	21	2
D1	Cambodia	13	18	0

Men's Double Division 1
2019 King's Cup Sepaktakraw World Championship

Singapore
First title

==== Men's Regu ====
Semifinal
A1	India
B1	New Zealand
Date: 28 August, 11:30
C1	United States
D1	Chinese Taipei

Final
A1	India
D1	Chinese Taipei

Men's Regu Division 1
2019 King's Cup Sepaktakraw World Championship

India
First title

==== Men's team ====
Semifinal
A1	Iran	2	2	–	2
B2	Bangladesh	0	0	–	0
B1	Australia	0	2	0	1
A2	Cambodia	2	0	2	2

Final
A1	Iran	2	2	–	2
A2	Cambodia	0	1	–	0

Men's Team Division 1
2019 King's Cup Sepaktakraw World Championship

Iran
First title

== Hoop event ==
=== Men category ===
Ranking round

The ranking round of Men's Hoop events was conducted on the first day of the tournament. The four highest-scoring teams will progress to the final round. Nevertheless, as of twelve national teams which inquired to compete, four of them later withdrew from the event for undisclosed reasons namely; Brazil, Oman, and Nepal. Meanwhile, Brunei, the Philippines, Thailand, and Vietnam, secured their place in the final round, the scoring result was listed below;

- Brazil: 0
- Brunei: 440 (QF)
- Cambodia: 150
- Germany: 190
- India: 300
- Laos: 380
- Nepal: 0
- Oman: 0
- Pakistan: 60
- Philippines: 520 (QF)
- Thailand: 770 (QF)
- Vietnam: 530 (QF)

Final round

Semifinal
25 August, 18:30
Brunei	590
Thailand	820
25 August, 19:10
Philippines	680
Vietnam	500

Final
26 August, 10:40
Thailand	750
Philippines	530

Men's Hoop
2019 King's Cup Sepaktakraw World Championship

Thailand
Thirty-fourth title

=== Women category ===
Quarterfinal
25 August, 08:00
Iraq	0
Vietnam	430
25 August, 09:20
Laos	370
Thailand	810
25 August, 08:00
Myanmar	700
Cambodia	150
25 August, 10:00
Indonesia	200
Philippines	490

Semifinal
25 August, 17:10
Vietnam	460
Thailand	550
25 August, 17:50
Myanmar	850
Philippines	540

Final
26 August, 10:00
Thailand	890
Myanmar	730

Women's Hoop
2019 King's Cup Sepaktakraw World Championship

Thailand
Thirty-fourth title

== Nations ==
1. Thailand
2. Vietnam
3. Cambodia
4. Brunei
5. Laos
6. Singapore
7. Philippines
8. Indonesia
9. Myanmar
10. Malaysia
11. China
12. South Korea
13. Chinese Taipei
14. Macau
15. Japan
16. Hong Kong
17. Sri Lanka
18. Nepal
19. Bangladesh
20. India
21. Pakistan
22. Afghanistan
23. Iran
24. Iraq
25. Oman
26. Australia
27. New Zealand
28. United States
29. Canada
30. Brazil
31. Switzerland
32. Germany
33. United Kingdom
34. Belgium
35. Portugal
36. France

== Final standing ==
=== Premier division ranking ===
Rank	Men category				Women category			
Rank	Men's Double (MD)	Men's Regu (MR)	Men's Team (MT)	Men's Hoop (MH)	Women's Double (WD)	Women's Regu (WR)	Women's Team (WT)	Women's Hoop (WH)
1st place, gold medalist(s)	Myanmar	Thailand	Thailand	Thailand	Myanmar	Thailand	Thailand	Thailand
2nd place, silver medalist(s)	South Korea	Indonesia	Indonesia	Philippines	Laos	Vietnam	Vietnam	Myanmar
3rd place, bronze medalist(s)	Laos; Malaysia	Malaysia; South Korea	Malaysia; Myanmar	Brunei; Vietnam	Indonesia; South Korea	Indonesia; South Korea	Indonesia; South Korea	Philippines; Vietnam
QF	Indonesia; Japan; Philippines; Vietnam	China; Myanmar; Singapore; Vietnam	Laos; Philippines; Singapore; South Korea	—N/a	China; Chinese Taipei; Japan; Malaysia	India; Japan; Malaysia; Philippines	Laos; Japan; Malaysia; Philippines	—N/a
GS	Brunei; China; Chinese Taipei; Iran; United States	Australia; Brunei; Japan	China; Chinese Taipei; India; Japan	Cambodia; Germany; India; Laos; Pakistan	Cambodia; Germany; Iraq; Iran; Pakistan	Chinese Taipei; China; Germany; Iraq; Pakistan	Cambodia; China; India; Iran; Myanmar; Pakistan	Cambodia; Indonesia; Laos; Iraq

=== Division 1 ranking ===
Rank	Category		
Rank	Men's Double (MD)	Men's Regu (MR)	Men's Team (MT)
1st place, gold medalist(s)	Singapore	India	Iran
2nd place, silver medalist(s)	Cambodia	Chinese Taipei	Cambodia
3rd place, bronze medalist(s)	Australia; Oman	New Zealand; United States	Australia; Bangladesh
GS	Afghanistan; Bangladesh; Brazil; Germany; Iraq; Hong Kong; Nepal; New Zealand; Sri Lanka; Switzerland	Bangladesh; Brazil; Germany; Hong Kong; Iran; Iraq; Nepal; Oman; Pakistan; Sri Lanka; Switzerland	Hong Kong; Iraq; Oman; Pakistan; Sri Lanka

Color key
Advanced to the Premier division of 2022 King's Cup. (only for the winning event.)
Possible relegation to the Division 1 of 2022 King's Cup.

=== Medal table (Premier divisions) ===
* Host nation (Thailand)

2019 King's Cup Sepaktakraw World Championship Medal Table
Rank	Nation	Gold	Silver	Bronze	Total
1	Thailand (THA)*	6	0	0	6
2	Myanmar (MYA)	2	1	1	4
3	Indonesia (INA)	0	2	3	5
4	Vietnam (VIE)	0	2	2	4
5	South Korea (KOR)	0	1	4	5
6	Laos (LAO)	0	1	1	2
6	Philippines (PHI)	0	1	1	2
8	Malaysia (MAS)	0	0	3	3
9	Brunei (BRU)	0	0	1	1
Totals (9 entries)		8	8	16	32

=== Medal table (Division 1) ===
* Host nation (Thailand)

2019 King's Cup Sepaktakraw World Championship Medal Table
Rank	Nation	Gold	Silver	Bronze	Total
1	India (IND)	1	0	0	1
1	Iran (IRN)	1	0	0	1
1	Singapore (SIN)	1	0	0	1
4	Cambodia (CAM)	0	2	0	2
5	Chinese Taipei (TPE)	0	1	0	1
6	Australia (AUS)	0	0	2	2
7	Bangladesh (BAN)	0	0	1	1
7	New Zealand (NZL)	0	0	1	1
7	Oman (OMA)	0	0	1	1
7	United States (USA)	0	0	1	1
Totals (10 entries)		3	3	6	12

== See also ==
- 2022 King's Cup Sepaktakraw World Championship
