= Fashion Island (Bangkok) =

Shopping mall in Bangkok

Fashion Island & The Promenade
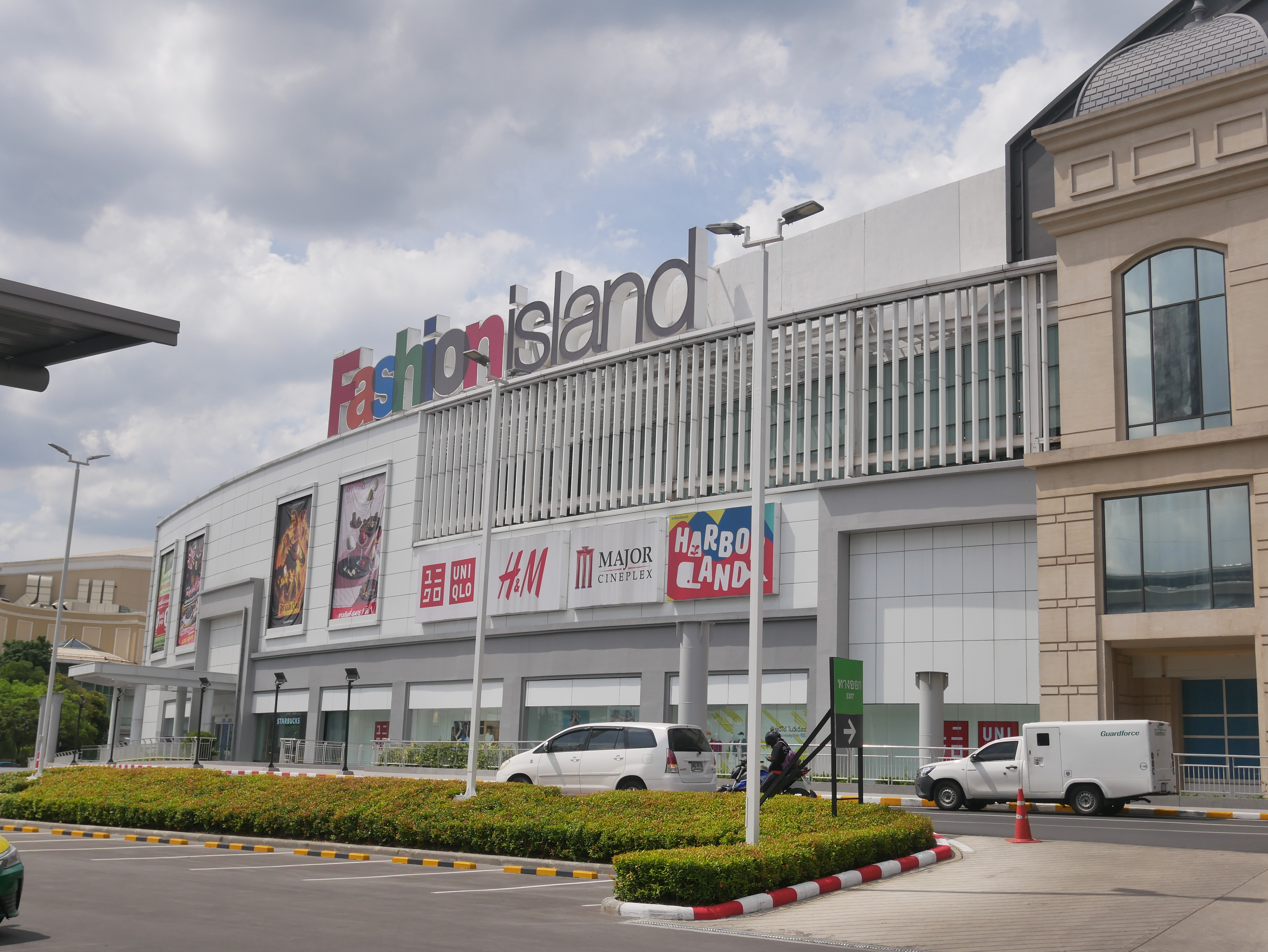
- Location: Khan Na Yao, Bangkok, Thailand
- Coordinates: 13°49′33″N 100°40′45″E
- Address: Ram Intra Road
- Opened: 15 June 1995 (Fashion Island); 9 May 2012 (The Promenade)
- Developer: Siam Retail Development Co., Ltd.
- Num. of stores: 300
- Floor area: 350,000 m^{2} (3,800,000 sq ft) (Fashion Island); 119,100 m^{2} (1,282,000 sq ft) (The Promenade)
- Parking: 12,000
- Website: fashionisland.co.th

Fashion Island Monorail

Overview
- Locale: Bangkok
- Transit type: Monorail
- Number of lines: 1
- Number of stations: 4

Operation
- Ended operation: 23 June 2002

Technical
- System length: 1.4 km (0.9 mi)

Fashion Island & The Promenade (Thai: แฟชั่น ไอส์แลนด์ & เดอะ พรอมานาด), commonly known as Fashion Island, is a shopping mall located on Ram Inthra Road, in Khan Na Yao District outskirt of Bangkok, Thailand.

Fashion Island is currently ranked as the Twenty-sixth largest mall in the World along with Dubai Mall and West Edmonton Mall (once biggest mall in the world until 2004).

The shopping mall featured an amusement park with a monorail circling around the mall. It was 1.4 km (0.87 mi) in length with four stations. The amusement park and monorail were both shut down after an accident. On 26 June 2002, a short circuit caused one train to catch fire. The train had no circuit breaker, and the passenger compartment was not protected by fireproof insulation. Two girls, six and eight years old, died in the fire, and two more children were injured from jumping out of the train.

Fashion Island is served by the Outer Ring Road - Ram Inthra Station of the MRT Pink Line that connects Nonthaburi and Bangkok, since November 2023.

== Anchors ==
=== Fashion Island ===
- Central The Store @ Fashion Island (Old Robinson Department Store)
  - Tops
  - B2S
  - Supersports
  - Power Buy
  - Officemate
- Big C
- Nitori
- Don Don Donki
- HomePro (Old Fashion Island Zone Move To New Parking Building B)
  - The Power by Homepro
  - Bike Express
- Sports World
- Food Island
- Food Market @ Fashion Island
- Island Hall
- HarborLand
- Major Cineplex 7 Cinemas (Old EGV Fashion Island)

=== The Promenade ===
- Gourmet Market
- B2S
- Prom Garden
- Prom Market
- Kidzoona
- Fitness First
- Promenade Cineplex 8 Cinemas

== See also ==
- List of shopping malls in Thailand
- List of largest shopping malls in Thailand
