= 2022 King's Cup Sepaktakraw World Championship =

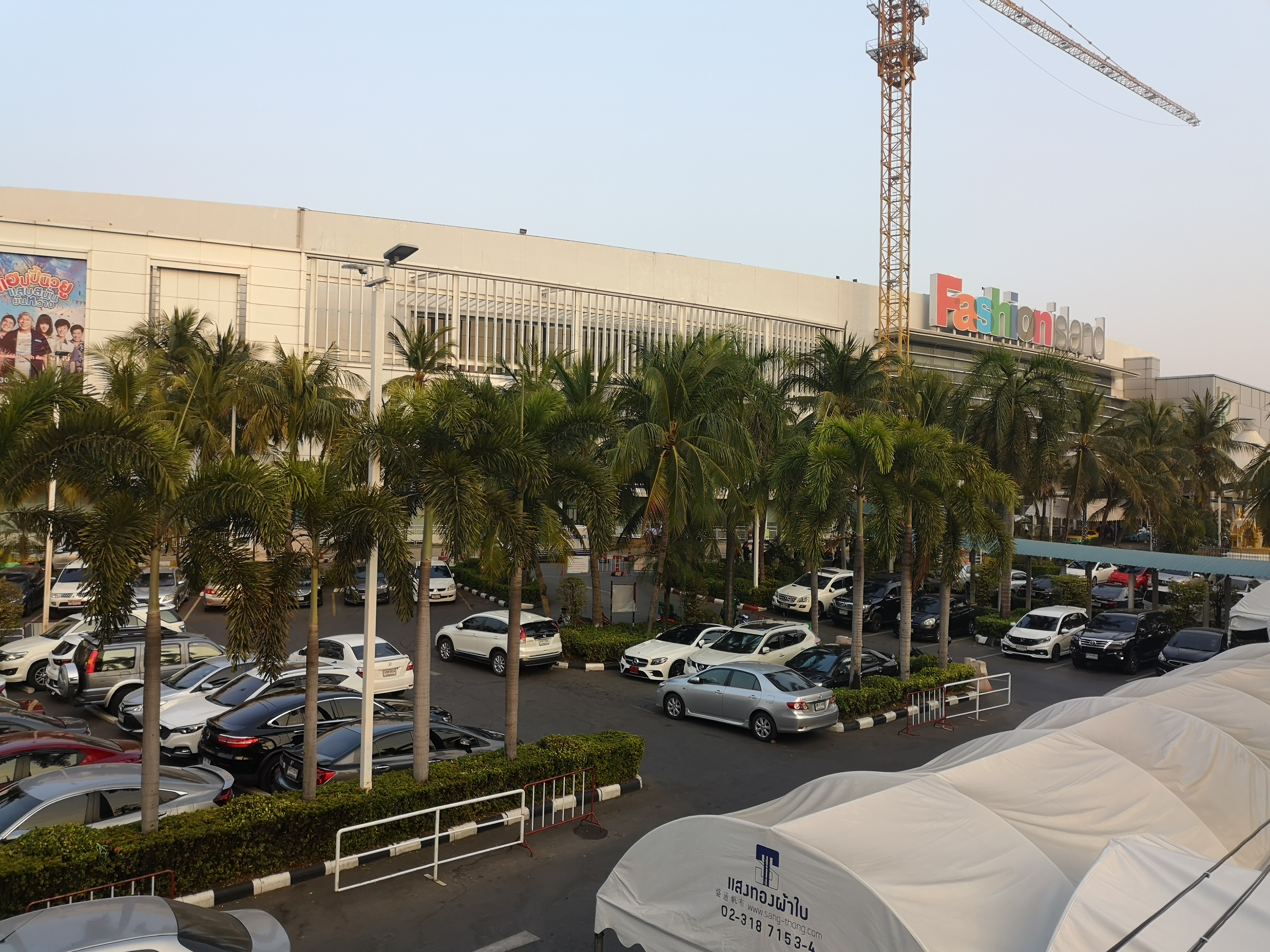
- Fashion Island Shopping Mall, the venue of the tournament

Tournament details
- Host country: Thailand
- City: Bangkok
- Dates: 23–31 July 2022
- Teams: 23 countries (from ISTAF confederations)
- Venue: Fashion Island Sports World

Final positions
- Champions: MT–PM: Thailand; MT–D1: Japan; MR–PM: Thailand; MR–D1: India; MD–PM: Malaysia; MQ–PM: South Korea; MQ–D1: Iran; MH–PM: Thailand; WT–PM: Thailand; WR–PM: South Korea; WD–PM: Laos; WQ–PM: Vietnam; WH–PM: Thailand; Mx.Q: Thailand

Tournament statistics
- Matches played: 222

The 2022 King's Cup Sepaktakraw World Championship (Thai: เซปักตะกร้อชิงแชมป์โลก คิงส์คัพ 2022) was the 35th edition of the international sepak takraw tournament King's Cup World Championship, co-organized by the Takraw Association of Thailand and the International Sepaktakraw Federation (ISTAF), held on 24 - 31 July 2022 at Fashion Island Sports World in Bangkok, Thailand. Twenty-three ISTAF member countries, mostly from Asia-Oceania, participated in the tournament.

Originally due to take place from 20 to 27 September 2020 at Fashion Island Sports World in Bangkok, the venue was changed to Udonthani in February 2020 after the Sports Association of Udon Thani Province request to host the tournament, and then back to Bangkok on 24 to 31 July 2022 due to the COVID-19 pandemic. Previously, the tournament was being postponed five times due to the aforementioned incidence; twice in late 2020, then in March and September 2021, to January 2022, and to 24-31 July, furthermore, the venue was also moved back to Bangkok. This is also the first time the King's Cup has been postponed, since its inception in 1985.

The tournament consisted of 222 matches played, which was classified into 11 event categories, three of which, namely Men's regu (MR), Men's team regu (MT), and Men's quad (MQ), was divided into two divisions; Premier (PM) and Division 1 (D1). Out of all 14 gold medals, Thailand won the most with six medals, followed by South Korea which won two medals in Men's quad and Women's double in the premier division. The competition was beamed live to a virtual audience worldwide via a digital terrestrial television and satellite television channel Mono 29 of Thailand.

== Background ==
=== History ===
After the excellent success of Thailand to host the 34th King's Cup Sepak Takraw World Championship in 2019, the country prepared to hold the subsequent tournament at the same venue, Fashion Island Sports World in Bangkok, from 20 to 27 September 2020. Nevertheless, during the internal meeting of the Executive Committee of the Takraw Association of Thailand on 27 February 2021, the committee officially endorsed a switching of the tournament venue to the province of Udon Thani, after being requested to host such an event, at the Montatip Hall located on UD Town Department Store in Udon Thani, by the local sports association, with the same schedule as planned. Howbeit, the race did not happen due to the global surge of the COVID-19 infection and was postponed to December 2020.

On 5 December 2020, after an annual meeting, the vice-president of the association stated that the situation of the COVID-19 outbreak must still be seen as well as the government travel restrictions during the pandemic, which causes a complicated challenge for the organizer to hold the tournament. Therefore, the 35th King’s Cup World Championship has set a new schedule of competition to be March 2021, with Udon Thani to remain hosting as before. Nonetheless, the event still could not happen as a result of the spike of COVID-19 infected number in Thailand in early 2021.

Later on 27 March 2021, the annual general meeting of the National Olympic Committee of Thailand has addressed the tournament issue and adopted the resolution to reprogramme the tournament to be held in September 2021, in the same host province. However, the president citing that the event might be again suspended to be conducted in 2022 instead, in case if the Thailand Coronavirus Disease 2019 Management Center (CDMC) does not allow the international players and staff teams to visit the country without a 14-days quarantine period, which will generate an exceptionally tremendous expense for the federation. The association also made an additionally regulation on 4 April 2021, citing all participated players and staff must be full-vaccinated and each has to separately start a 7-day quarantine period at the hotel serving as an alternative quarantine facility before taking part in the tournament, aiming to be the precautionary measure amidst the COVID-19 pandemic.

In April 2022, International Sepak Takraw Federation (ISTAF) secretary-general Datuk Abdul Halim Kader stated that the 35th King's Cup was rescheduled to be held in Bangkok on 24-31 July, and over 30 countries was expected to participate. The tournament consisted of five men's categories, five women's categories, and two mixed events. Moreover, the video challenge camera to judge disputed services was also introduced in such an edition.

Originally, two new-category events was planned to be introduced in this edition; firstly, the mixed doubles duo with one man and woman on each team, and secondly, the mixed regu with one man and two women in the team, aiming to obtain the international federation approval before making it the official sport at the 2021 Asian Indoor and Martial Arts Games, which was also held in Thailand in March 2022, but the plan was later canceled due to the postponement of the tournament.

=== Participating countries ===
Twenty-three ISTAF membership countries confirmed to participate, including;

Asian Sepaktakraw Federation (ASTAF)

- Australia
- Bangladesh
- Brunei
- Cambodia
- India
- Indonesia
- Iran
- Iraq
- Japan
- Korea
- Laos
- Malaysia
- Myanmar
- Nepal
- New Zealand
- Oman
- Pakistan
- Sri Lanka
- Taiwan
- Thailand
- Vietnam

Federation of European Sepak Takraw Associations (FESTA)

- Switzerland

ISTAF members with no regional affiliation

- Brazil

== Tournament detail ==
=== Division and category ===
The tournament was divided into three categories: male, female, and mixed. Due to a high number of the participating team in the male category, the category was further divided into Premier division (PM) and Division 1 (D1). Each country is allowed a maximum of 3 participating events in each category.

==== Men's category ====
| Division | | Event | | | |
| Division | | Regu (MR) | Team regu (MT) | Quad (MQ) | Double (MD) |
|---|---|---|---|---|---|
| Premier (PM) | Group A | New Zealand; Thailand; Vietnam | India; Laos; Myanmar; Thailand | India; Myanmar; South Korea; Sri Lanka | Australia; Brazil; Myanmar; Sri Lanka |
| Premier (PM) | Group B | Chinese Taipei; Japan; Malaysia; South Korea | Brunei; Indonesia; Malaysia; South Korea | Chinese Taipei; Indonesia; Japan; Vietnam | Chinese Taipei; Indonesia; Iraq; Switzerland |
| Premier (PM) | Group C | —N/a | —N/a | —N/a | Laos; New Zealand; Oman |
| Premier (PM) | Group D | —N/a | —N/a | —N/a | Malaysia; Nepal; Vietnam |
| Division 1 (D1) | Group A | India; Iran; Iraq; Oman | Iran; Oman; Pakistan | Australia; Cambodia; Iraq; Nepal | —N/a |
| Division 1 (D1) | Group B | Australia; Bangladesh; Nepal; Sri Lanka; Switzerland | Bangladesh; Cambodia; Japan | Bangladesh; Iran; New Zealand; Pakistan | —N/a |

Event
Hoop (MH)
Brazil
Brunei
Cambodia
Laos
Pakistan
Thailand

==== Women's category ====
No divided division for the women's category due to the small number of participating teams.

| Division | | Event | | | |
| Division | | Regu (WR) | Team regu (WT) | Quad (WQ) | Double (WD) |
|---|---|---|---|---|---|
| Premier (PM) | Group A | Malaysia; Nepal; Vietnam | India; Laos; South Korea; Thailand | Chinese Taipei; Japan; Sri Lanka; Thailand | Indonesia; Iraq; Myanmar; Pakistan; Sri Lanka |
| Premier (PM) | Group B | Pakistan; South Korea; Sri Lanka | Cambodia; Indonesia; Japan; Vietnam | Cambodia; Malaysia; Pakistan; Vietnam | Chinese Taipei; Iran; Laos; Malaysia; Nepal |
| Premier (PM) | Group C | India; Iraq; Japan | —N/a | Indonesia; Iraq; Myanmar | —N/a |
| Premier (PM) | Group D | Chinese Taipei; Iran; Myanmar | —N/a | Iran; Laos; South Korea | —N/a |

Event
Hoop (WH)
Cambodia
India
Laos
Thailand

==== Mixed category ====
No divided division for the mixed's category due to the small number of participating teams.

| Event | Group | |
| Event | Group A | Group B |
|---|---|---|
| Mixed quad (Mx.Q) | Chinese Taipei; Myanmar; Sri Lanka; Thailand | India; Indonesia; Iraq; Pakistan; Vietnam |

=== Schedule ===
| OC | Opening ceremony | GS | Group Stage | SF | Semifinals | 1 | Event finals | CC | Closing ceremony |

| July 2022 | 24th Sun | 25th Mon | 26th Tue | 27th Wed | 28th Thu | 29th Fri | 30th Sat | 31st Sun | Events |
|---|---|---|---|---|---|---|---|---|---|
| Ceremonies | OC | | | | | | | CC | —N/a |
| Men's Hoop (MH) | ● | 1 | | | | | | | 1 |
| Women's Hoop (WH) | ● | 1 | | | | | | | 1 |
| Men's Doubles (MD) | | | ● | ● | | ● | | 1 | 1 |
| Women's Doubles (WD) | | | ● | ● | ● | ● | | 1 | 1 |
| Men's Regu (MR) | ● | ● | ● | 1 | 1 | | | | 2 |
| Women's Regu (WR) | ● | ● | ● | | 1 | | | | 1 |
| Men's Team Regu (MT) | | | | | ● | ● | 1 | 1 | 2 |
| Women's Team Regu (WT) | | | | | ● | ● | 1 | | 1 |
| Men's Quad (MQ) | ● | ● | ● | 2 | | | | | 2 |
| Women's Quad (WQ) | ● | ● | ● | 1 | | | | | 1 |
| Mixed Quad (MxQ) | | | ● | ● | ● | ● | 1 | | 1 |
| Daily medal events | 0 | 2 | 0 | 4 | 2 | 0 | 3 | 3 | 14 |
| Cumulative total | 0 | 2 | 2 | 6 | 8 | 8 | 11 | 14 | 14 |
| July 2022 | 24th Sun | 25th Mon | 26th Tue | 27th Wed | 28th Thu | 29th Fri | 30th Sat | 31st Sun | Total events |

== Results summary ==
=== Men's category ===
| Rank | Premier division (PM) | | | | | Division 1 (D1) | | |
| Rank | Double (MD-PM) | Regu (MR-PM) | Quad (MQ-PM) | Team regu (MT-PM) | Hoop (MH-PM) | Regu (MR-D1) | Quad (MQ-D1) | Team regu (MT-D1) |
|---|---|---|---|---|---|---|---|---|
| 1st place, gold medalist(s) | Malaysia | Thailand | South Korea | Thailand | Thailand | India | Iran | Japan |
| 2nd place, silver medalist(s) | Laos | South Korea | Vietnam | South Korea | Cambodia | Iran | Cambodia | Iran |
| 3rd place, bronze medalist(s) | Indonesia; Myanmar | Malaysia; Vietnam | Japan; Myanmar | Laos; Malaysia | Laos; Pakistan | Bangladesh; Nepal | Bangladesh; Nepal | Cambodia; Oman |
| GS | Australia; Brazil; Chinese Taipei; Iraq; Nepal; New Zealand; Oman; Sri Lanka; Switzerland; Vietnam | Chinese Taipei; Japan; New Zealand | Chinese Taipei; India; Indonesia; Sri Lanka | India; Indonesia; Myanmar | Brazil; Brunei | Australia; Iraq; Oman; Sri Lanka; Switzerland | Australia; Iraq; New Zealand; Pakistan | Bangladesh; Pakistan |

=== Women's category ===
| Rank | Double (WD-PM) | Regu (WR-PM) | Quad (WQ-PM) | Team regu (WT-PM) | Hoop (WH-PM) |
|---|---|---|---|---|---|
| 1st place, gold medalist(s) | Laos | South Korea | Vietnam | Thailand | Thailand |
| 2nd place, silver medalist(s) | Indonesia | Vietnam | Thailand | Vietnam | Laos |
| 3rd place, bronze medalist(s) | Malaysia; Myanmar | Japan; Myanmar | Indonesia; South Korea | Indonesia; South Korea | Cambodia; India |
| GS | Chinese Taipei; Iran; Iraq; Nepal; Pakistan; Sri Lanka | Chinese Taipei; India; Iran; Iraq; Malaysia; Nepal; Pakistan; Sri Lanka | Cambodia; Chinese Taipei; Iran; Iraq; Japan; Laos; Malaysia; Myanmar; Pakistan; Sri Lanka | Cambodia; India; Japan; Laos | —N/a |

=== Mixed category ===
| Rank | Quad (Mx.Q) |
|---|---|
| 1st place, gold medalist(s) | Thailand |
| 2nd place, silver medalist(s) | Indonesia |
| 3rd place, bronze medalist(s) | India; Myanmar |
| GS | Chinese Taipei; Iraq; Pakistan; Sri Lanka; Vietnam |

=== Medal table ===
Premier division

* Host nation (Thailand)

2022 King's Cup Sepaktakraw World Championship Medal Table: Premier division (PM)
| Rank | Nation | Gold | Silver | Bronze | Total |
|---|---|---|---|---|---|
| 1 | Thailand (THA)* | 6 | 1 | 0 | 7 |
| 2 | South Korea (KOR) | 2 | 2 | 2 | 6 |
| 3 | Vietnam (VIE) | 1 | 3 | 1 | 5 |
| 4 | Laos (LAO) | 1 | 2 | 2 | 5 |
| 5 | Malaysia (MAS) | 1 | 0 | 3 | 4 |
| 6 | Indonesia (INA) | 0 | 2 | 3 | 5 |
| 7 | Cambodia (CAM) | 0 | 1 | 1 | 2 |
| 8 | Myanmar (MYA) | 0 | 0 | 5 | 5 |
| 9 | India (IND) | 0 | 0 | 2 | 2 |
| 9 | Japan (JPN) | 0 | 0 | 2 | 2 |
| 11 | Pakistan (PAK) | 0 | 0 | 1 | 1 |
| Totals (11 entries) | | 11 | 11 | 22 | 44 |

Division 1

* Host nation (Thailand)

2022 King's Cup Sepaktakraw World Championship Medal Table: Division 1 (D1)
| Rank | Nation | Gold | Silver | Bronze | Total |
|---|---|---|---|---|---|
| 1 | Iran (IRI) | 1 | 2 | 0 | 3 |
| 2 | India (IND) | 1 | 0 | 0 | 1 |
| 2 | Japan (JPN) | 1 | 0 | 0 | 1 |
| 4 | Cambodia (CAM) | 0 | 1 | 1 | 2 |
| 5 | Bangladesh (BAN) | 0 | 0 | 2 | 2 |
| 5 | Nepal (NEP) | 0 | 0 | 2 | 2 |
| 7 | Oman (OMA) | 0 | 0 | 1 | 1 |
| Totals (7 entries) | | 3 | 3 | 6 | 12 |

== Regu ==
=== Men's regu (MR) ===
==== MR Premier division (MR-PM) ====
===== MR-PM Group stage =====
Group A

| Pos | Team | Pld | W | L | Pts | SW | SL | SR | SPW | SPL | SPR | Qualification |
|---|---|---|---|---|---|---|---|---|---|---|---|---|
| 1 | Thailand | 2 | 2 | 0 | 6 | 4 | 0 | MAX | 84 | 32 | 2.625 | Advance to final round |
| 2 | Vietnam | 2 | 1 | 1 | 3 | 2 | 2 | 1.000 | 64 | 60 | 1.067 | Advance to final round |
| 3 | New Zealand | 2 | 0 | 2 | 0 | 0 | 4 | 0.000 | 28 | 84 | 0.333 | |

Source: "โปรแกรมแข่งขันตะกร้อ ชิงถ้วยพระราชทาน "คิงส์คัพ"ครั้งที่ 35 ระหว่างวันที่ 24-31 ก.ค.2565 ที่ศูนย์การค้าแฟชั่นไอส์แลนด์ กรุงเทพฯ". เซปัก ตะกร้อ - Sepak Takraw (in Thai). 24 July 2022.

| 24 July; 16:30 | Thailand | 2-0 | Vietnam | Fashion Island, Bangkok |
| 24 July; 16:30 | (21-9, 21-13); R2 Report | | | Fashion Island, Bangkok |

| 25 July; 14:30 | Vietnam | 2-0 | New Zealand | Fashion Island, Bangkok |
| 25 July; 14:30 | (21-6, 21-12); R2 Report | | | Fashion Island, Bangkok |

| 25 July; 18:00 | Thailand | 2-0 | New Zealand | Fashion Island, Bangkok |
| 25 July; 18:00 | (21-8, 21-2); R2 Report | | | Fashion Island, Bangkok |

Group B

| Pos | Team | Pld | W | L | Pts | SW | SL | SR | SPW | SPL | SPR | Qualification |
|---|---|---|---|---|---|---|---|---|---|---|---|---|
| 1 | South Korea | 3 | 3 | 0 | 9 | 6 | 0 | MAX | 126 | 73 | 1.726 | Advance to final round |
| 2 | Malaysia | 3 | 2 | 1 | 6 | 4 | 2 | 2.000 | 117 | 75 | 1.560 | Advance to final round |
| 3 | Japan | 3 | 1 | 2 | 3 | 2 | 4 | 0.500 | 86 | 114 | 0.754 | |
| 4 | Chinese Taipei | 3 | 0 | 3 | 0 | 0 | 6 | 0.000 | 59 | 126 | 0.468 | |

Source: "โปรแกรมแข่งขันตะกร้อ ชิงถ้วยพระราชทาน "คิงส์คัพ"ครั้งที่ 35 ระหว่างวันที่ 24-31 ก.ค.2565 ที่ศูนย์การค้าแฟชั่นไอส์แลนด์ กรุงเทพฯ". เซปัก ตะกร้อ - Sepak Takraw (in Thai). 24 July 2022.

| 24 July; 17:15 | Malaysia | 0-2 | South Korea | Fashion Island, Bangkok |
| 24 July; 17:15 | (18-21, 15-21); R2 Report | | | Fashion Island, Bangkok |

| 24 July; 18:00 | Japan | 2-0 | Chinese Taipei | Fashion Island, Bangkok |
| 24 July; 18:00 | (21-13, 21-17); R2 Report | | | Fashion Island, Bangkok |

| 25 July; 15:00 | Malaysia | 2-0 | Japan | Fashion Island, Bangkok |
| 25 July; 15:00 | (21-13, 21-9); R2 Report | | | Fashion Island, Bangkok |

| 25 July; 15:00 | South Korea | 2-0 | Chinese Taipei | Fashion Island, Bangkok |
| 25 July; 15:00 | (21-5, 21-13); R2 Report | | | Fashion Island, Bangkok |

| 25 July; 18:15 | Malaysia | 2-0 | Chinese Taipei | Fashion Island, Bangkok |
| 25 July; 18:15 | (21-7, 21-4); R2 Report | | | Fashion Island, Bangkok |

| 25 July; 18:15 | South Korea | 2-0 | Japan | Fashion Island, Bangkok |
| 25 July; 18:15 | (21-9, 21-13); R2 Report | | | Fashion Island, Bangkok |

===== MR-PM Final =====
Semifinal
1A | Thailand | 21 | 21 | 2
2B | Malaysia | 17 | 10 | 0
Date: 26 July, 13:30 Report
1B | South Korea | 21 | 25 | 2
2A | Vietnam | 12 | 24 | 0

Final
Thailand | 21 | 21 | 2
South Korea | 10 | 10 | 0

Winner
Men's Regu Premier Division
2022 King's Cup Sepaktakraw World Championship
(Thailand)
Thailand
Thirty-fifth title

==== MR Division 1 (MR-D1) ====
===== MR-D1 Group stage =====
Group A

| Pos | Team | Pld | W | L | Pts | SW | SL | SR | SPW | SPL | SPR | Qualification |
|---|---|---|---|---|---|---|---|---|---|---|---|---|
| 1 | India | 3 | 3 | 0 | 8 | 6 | 1 | 6.000 | 144 | 97 | 1.485 | Advance to final round |
| 2 | Iran | 3 | 2 | 1 | 7 | 5 | 2 | 2.500 | 137 | 108 | 1.269 | Advance to final round |
| 3 | Oman | 3 | 1 | 2 | 3 | 2 | 4 | 0.500 | 93 | 115 | 0.809 | |
| 4 | Iraq | 3 | 0 | 3 | 0 | 0 | 6 | 0.000 | 72 | 126 | 0.571 | |

Source: "โปรแกรมแข่งขันตะกร้อ ชิงถ้วยพระราชทาน "คิงส์คัพ"ครั้งที่ 35 ระหว่างวันที่ 24-31 ก.ค.2565 ที่ศูนย์การค้าแฟชั่นไอส์แลนด์ กรุงเทพฯ". เซปัก ตะกร้อ - Sepak Takraw (in Thai). 24 July 2022.

| 24 July; 12:45 | Iraq | 0-2 | India | Fashion Island, Bangkok |
| 24 July; 12:45 | (11-21, 11-21); R2 Report | | | Fashion Island, Bangkok |

| 24 July; 12:45 | Iran | 2-0 | Oman | Fashion Island, Bangkok |
| 24 July; 12:45 | (21-6, 23-21); R2 Report | | | Fashion Island, Bangkok |

| 25 July; 10:30 | Iraq | 0-2 | Iran | Fashion Island, Bangkok |
| 25 July; 10:30 | (10-21, 11-21); R2 Report | | | Fashion Island, Bangkok |

| 25 July; 10:30 | India | 2-0 | Oman | Fashion Island, Bangkok |
| 25 July; 10:30 | (21-12, 21-12); R2 Report | | | Fashion Island, Bangkok |

| 25 July; 15:15 | Iraq | 0-2 | Oman | Fashion Island, Bangkok |
| 25 July; 15:15 | (18-21, 11-21); R2 Report | | | Fashion Island, Bangkok |

| 25 July; 15:15 | India | 2-1 | Iran | Fashion Island, Bangkok |
| 25 July; 15:15 | (17-21, 22-20, 21-10); R2 Report | | | Fashion Island, Bangkok |

Group B

| Pos | Team | Pld | W | L | Pts | SW | SL | SR | SPW | SPL | SPR | Qualification |
|---|---|---|---|---|---|---|---|---|---|---|---|---|
| 1 | Nepal | 4 | 4 | 0 | 12 | 8 | 0 | MAX | 170 | 99 | 1.717 | Advance to final round |
| 2 | Bangladesh | 4 | 3 | 1 | 9 | 6 | 2 | 3.000 | 157 | 105 | 1.495 | Advance to final round |
| 3 | Australia | 4 | 2 | 2 | 5 | 4 | 5 | 0.800 | 149 | 169 | 0.882 | |
| 4 | Sri Lanka | 4 | 1 | 3 | 4 | 3 | 5 | 0.600 | 148 | 176 | 0.841 | |
| 5 | Switzerland | 4 | 0 | 4 | 0 | 0 | 8 | 0.000 | 93 | 168 | 0.554 | |

Source: "โปรแกรมแข่งขันตะกร้อ ชิงถ้วยพระราชทาน "คิงส์คัพ"ครั้งที่ 35 ระหว่างวันที่ 24-31 ก.ค.2565 ที่ศูนย์การค้าแฟชั่นไอส์แลนด์ กรุงเทพฯ". เซปัก ตะกร้อ - Sepak Takraw (in Thai). 24 July 2022.

| 24 July; 13:00 | Sri Lanka | 2-0 | Switzerland | Fashion Island, Bangkok |
| 24 July; 13:00 | (21-12, 21-16); R2 Report | | | Fashion Island, Bangkok |

| 24 July; 13:00 | Nepal | 2-0 | Bangladesh | Fashion Island, Bangkok |
| 24 July; 13:00 | (23-21, 21-10); R2 Report | | | Fashion Island, Bangkok |

| 24 July; 20:15 | Switzerland | 0-2 | Nepal | Fashion Island, Bangkok |
| 24 July; 20:15 | (9-21, 10-21); R2 Report | | | Fashion Island, Bangkok |

| 24 July; 20:15 | Bangladesh | 2-0 | Australia | Fashion Island, Bangkok |
| 24 July; 20:15 | (21-10, 21-7); R2 Report | | | Fashion Island, Bangkok |

| 25 July; 11:15 | Sri Lanka | 0-2 | Bangladesh | Fashion Island, Bangkok |
| 25 July; 11:15 | (12-21, 10-21); R2 Report | | | Fashion Island, Bangkok |

| 25 July; 11:15 | Nepal | 2-0 | Australia | Fashion Island, Bangkok |
| 25 July; 11:15 | (21-14, 21-12); R2 Report | | | Fashion Island, Bangkok |

| 25 July; 15:45 | Sri Lanka | 1-2 | Australia | Fashion Island, Bangkok |
| 25 July; 15:45 | (20-22, 23-21, 18-21); R2 Report | | | Fashion Island, Bangkok |

| 25 July; 15:45 | Switzerland | 0-2 | Bangladesh | Fashion Island, Bangkok |
| 25 July; 15:45 | (6-21, 16-21); R2 Report | | | Fashion Island, Bangkok |

| 26 July; 9:00 | Sri Lanka | 0-2 | Nepal | Fashion Island, Bangkok |
| 26 July; 9:00 | (11-21, 12-21); R2 Report | | | Fashion Island, Bangkok |

| 26 July; 9:00 | Switzerland | 0-2 | Australia | Fashion Island, Bangkok |
| 26 July; 9:00 | (11-21, 13-21); R2 Report | | | Fashion Island, Bangkok |

===== MR-D1 Final =====
Semifinal
1A | India | 21 | 21 | - | 2
2B | Bangladesh | 10 | 13 | - | 0
Date: 26 July, 12:45 Report
1B | Nepal | 12 | 11 | - | 0
2A | Iran | 21 | 21 | - | 2

Final
India | 21 | 5 | 21 | 2
Iran | 17 | 21 | 17 | 1

Winner
Men's Regu Division 1
2022 King's Cup Sepaktakraw World Championship
(India)
India
Second title

=== Women's regu (WR) ===
==== WR-PM Group stage ====
Group A

| Pos | Team | Pld | W | L | Pts | SW | SL | SR | SPW | SPL | SPR | Qualification |
|---|---|---|---|---|---|---|---|---|---|---|---|---|
| 1 | Vietnam | 2 | 2 | 0 | 6 | 4 | 0 | MAX | 84 | 37 | 2.270 | Advance to final round |
| 2 | Malaysia | 2 | 1 | 1 | 3 | 2 | 2 | 1.000 | 61 | 64 | 0.953 | |
| 3 | Nepal | 2 | 0 | 2 | 0 | 0 | 4 | 0.000 | 40 | 84 | 0.476 | |

Source: "โปรแกรมแข่งขันตะกร้อ ชิงถ้วยพระราชทาน "คิงส์คัพ"ครั้งที่ 35 ระหว่างวันที่ 24-31 ก.ค.2565 ที่ศูนย์การค้าแฟชั่นไอส์แลนด์ กรุงเทพฯ". เซปัก ตะกร้อ - Sepak Takraw (in Thai). 24 July 2022.

| 24 July; 13:30 | Vietnam | 2-0 | Malaysia | Fashion Island, Bangkok |
| 24 July; 13:30 | (21-9, 21-10); R2 Report | | | Fashion Island, Bangkok |

| 25 July; 13:45 | Malaysia | 2-0 | Nepal | Fashion Island, Bangkok |
| 25 July; 13:45 | (21-5, 21-17); R2 Report | | | Fashion Island, Bangkok |

| 25 July; 16:45 | Vietnam | 2-0 | Nepal | Fashion Island, Bangkok |
| 25 July; 16:45 | (21-9, 21-9); R2 Report | | | Fashion Island, Bangkok |

Group B

| Pos | Team | Pld | W | L | Pts | SW | SL | SR | SPW | SPL | SPR | Qualification |
|---|---|---|---|---|---|---|---|---|---|---|---|---|
| 1 | South Korea | 2 | 2 | 0 | 6 | 4 | 0 | MAX | 84 | 19 | 4.421 | Advance to final round |
| 2 | Sri Lanka | 2 | 1 | 1 | 3 | 2 | 2 | 1.000 | 53 | 65 | 0.815 | |
| 3 | Pakistan | 2 | 0 | 2 | 0 | 0 | 4 | 0.000 | 31 | 84 | 0.369 | |

Source: "โปรแกรมแข่งขันตะกร้อ ชิงถ้วยพระราชทาน "คิงส์คัพ"ครั้งที่ 35 ระหว่างวันที่ 24-31 ก.ค.2565 ที่ศูนย์การค้าแฟชั่นไอส์แลนด์ กรุงเทพฯ". เซปัก ตะกร้อ - Sepak Takraw (in Thai). 24 July 2022.

| 24 July; 13:30 | South Korea | 2-0 | Pakistan | Fashion Island, Bangkok |
| 24 July; 13:30 | (21-1, 21-7); R2 Report | | | Fashion Island, Bangkok |

| 25 July; 13:45 | Pakistan | 0-2 | Sri Lanka | Fashion Island, Bangkok |
| 25 July; 13:45 | (17-21, 6-21); R2 Report | | | Fashion Island, Bangkok |

| 25 July; 16:45 | South Korea | 2-0 | Sri Lanka | Fashion Island, Bangkok |
| 25 July; 16:45 | (21-5, 21-6); R2 Report | | | Fashion Island, Bangkok |

Group C

| Pos | Team | Pld | W | L | Pts | SW | SL | SR | SPW | SPL | SPR | Qualification |
|---|---|---|---|---|---|---|---|---|---|---|---|---|
| 1 | Japan | 2 | 2 | 0 | 6 | 4 | 0 | MAX | 84 | 42 | 2.000 | Advance to final round |
| 2 | India | 2 | 1 | 1 | 3 | 2 | 2 | 1.000 | 74 | 47 | 1.574 | |
| 3 | Iraq | 2 | 0 | 2 | 0 | 0 | 4 | 0.000 | 15 | 84 | 0.179 | |

Source: "โปรแกรมแข่งขันตะกร้อ ชิงถ้วยพระราชทาน "คิงส์คัพ"ครั้งที่ 35 ระหว่างวันที่ 24-31 ก.ค.2565 ที่ศูนย์การค้าแฟชั่นไอส์แลนด์ กรุงเทพฯ". เซปัก ตะกร้อ - Sepak Takraw (in Thai). 24 July 2022.

| 24 July; 13:45 | India | 2-0 | Iraq | Fashion Island, Bangkok |
| 24 July; 13:45 | (21-3, 21-2); R2 Report | | | Fashion Island, Bangkok |

| 25 July; 14:15 | India | 0-2 | Japan | Fashion Island, Bangkok |
| 25 July; 14:15 | (19-21, 13-21); R2 Report | | | Fashion Island, Bangkok |

| 25 July; 17:15 | Japan | 2-0 | Iraq | Fashion Island, Bangkok |
| 25 July; 17:15 | (21-5, 21-5); Report | | | Fashion Island, Bangkok |

Group D

| Pos | Team | Pld | W | L | Pts | SW | SL | SR | SPW | SPL | SPR | Qualification |
|---|---|---|---|---|---|---|---|---|---|---|---|---|
| 1 | Myanmar | 2 | 2 | 0 | 5 | 4 | 1 | 4.000 | 95 | 62 | 1.532 | Advance to final round |
| 2 | Chinese Taipei | 2 | 1 | 1 | 3 | 3 | 2 | 1.500 | 111 | 110 | 1.009 | |
| 3 | Iran | 2 | 0 | 2 | 1 | 1 | 4 | 0.250 | 72 | 106 | 0.679 | |

Source: "โปรแกรมแข่งขันตะกร้อ ชิงถ้วยพระราชทาน "คิงส์คัพ"ครั้งที่ 35 ระหว่างวันที่ 24-31 ก.ค.2565 ที่ศูนย์การค้าแฟชั่นไอส์แลนด์ กรุงเทพฯ". เซปัก ตะกร้อ - Sepak Takraw (in Thai). 24 July 2022.

| 24 July; 13:45 | Myanmar | 2-1 | Chinese Taipei | Fashion Island, Bangkok |
| 24 July; 13:45 | (11-21, 21-12, 21-14); R2 Report | | | Fashion Island, Bangkok |

| 25 July; 14:15 | Chinese Taipei | 2-1 | Iran | Fashion Island, Bangkok |
| 25 July; 14:15 | (21-23, 22-20, 21-14); R2 Report | | | Fashion Island, Bangkok |

| 25 July; 17:15 | Myanmar | 2-0 | Iran | Fashion Island, Bangkok |
| 25 July; 17:15 | (21-9, 21-6); R2 Report | | | Fashion Island, Bangkok |

==== WR-PM Final ====
Semifinal
1A | Vietnam | 21 | 21 | - | 2
1C | Japan | 6 | 7 | - | 0
Date: 26 July, 13:30 Report
1B | South Korea | 21 | 21 | - | 2
1D | Myanmar | 18 | 18 | - | 0

Final
South Korea | 18 | 21 | 21 | 2
Vietnam | 21 | 18 | 14 | 1

Winner
Women's Regu Premier Division
2022 King's Cup Sepaktakraw World Championship
(South Korea)
South Korea
First title

== Team regu ==
=== Men's team regu (MT) ===
==== MT Premier division (MT-PM) ====
===== MT-PM Group stage =====
Group A

| Pos | Team | Pld | W | L | Pts | SW | SL | SR | SPW | SPL | SPR | Qualification |
|---|---|---|---|---|---|---|---|---|---|---|---|---|
| 1 | Thailand | 3 | 3 | 0 | 9 | 18 | 0 | MAX | 378 | 181 | 2.088 | Advance to final round |
| 2 | Laos | 3 | 2 | 1 | 4 | 9 | 12 | 0.750 | 334 | 364 | 0.918 | Advance to final round |
| 3 | Myanmar | 3 | 1 | 2 | 3 | 7 | 14 | 0.500 | 327 | 384 | 0.852 | |
| 4 | India | 3 | 0 | 3 | 2 | 6 | 14 | 0.429 | 225 | 388 | 0.580 | |

Source: "โปรแกรมแข่งขันตะกร้อ ชิงถ้วยพระราชทาน "คิงส์คัพ"ครั้งที่ 35 ระหว่างวันที่ 24-31 ก.ค.2565 ที่ศูนย์การค้าแฟชั่นไอส์แลนด์ กรุงเทพฯ". เซปัก ตะกร้อ - Sepak Takraw (in Thai). 24 July 2022.

| 28 July; 11:45 | Thailand | 3-0 | Myanmar | Fashion Island, Bangkok |
| 28 July; 11:45 | Team A: 2-0 (21-3, 21-13); Team B: 2-0 (21-13, 21-14); Team C: 2-0 (21-12, 21-11); R2 Report | | | Fashion Island, Bangkok |

| 28 July; 11:45 | Laos | 2-1 | India | Fashion Island, Bangkok |
| 28 July; 11:45 | Team A: 0-2 (16-21, 20-22); Team B: 2-1 (12-21, 21-15, 21-17); Team C: 2-0 (21-4,21-7); R2 Report | | | Fashion Island, Bangkok |

| 29 July; 11:00 | Thailand | 3-0 | Laos | Fashion Island, Bangkok |
| 29 July; 11:00 | Team A: 2-0 (21-12, 21-10); Team B: 2-0 (21-11, 21-10); Team C: 2-0 (21-8, 21-5); R2 Report | | | Fashion Island, Bangkok |

| 29 July; 11:00 | Myanmar | 2-1 | India | Fashion Island, Bangkok |
| 29 July; 11:00 | Team A: 2-0 (21-11, 21-16); Team B: 2-1 (21-14, 15-21, 21-8); Team C: 0-2 (12-21, 19-21); R2 Report | | | Fashion Island, Bangkok |

| 30 July; 09:00 | Thailand | 3-0 | India | Fashion Island, Bangkok |
| 30 July; 09:00 | Team A: 2-0 (21-9, 21-5); Team B: 2-0 (21-16, 21-13); Team C: 2-0 (21-7, 21-9); R2 Report | | | Fashion Island, Bangkok |

| 30 July; 09:00 | Myanmar | 1-2 | Laos | Fashion Island, Bangkok |
| 30 July; 09:00 | Team A: 1-2 (16-21, 21-18, 17-21); Team B: 2-1 (21-12, 13-21, 21-11); Team C: 0-2 (5-21, 17-21); R2 Report | | | Fashion Island, Bangkok |

Group B

| Pos | Team | Pld | W | L | Pts | SW | SL | SR | SPW | SPL | SPR | Qualification |
|---|---|---|---|---|---|---|---|---|---|---|---|---|
| 1 | South Korea | 3 | 3 | 0 | 8 | 16 | 5 | 3.200 | 414 | 260 | 1.592 | Advance to final round |
| 2 | Malaysia | 3 | 2 | 1 | 7 | 16 | 4 | 4.000 | 402 | 232 | 1.733 | Advance to final round |
| 3 | Indonesia | 3 | 1 | 2 | 3 | 7 | 12 | 0.583 | 330 | 275 | 1.200 | |
| 4 | Brunei | 3 | 0 | 3 | 0 | 0 | 18 | 0.000 | 0 | 378 | 0.000 | Withdrawn |

Source: "โปรแกรมแข่งขันตะกร้อ ชิงถ้วยพระราชทาน "คิงส์คัพ"ครั้งที่ 35 ระหว่างวันที่ 24-31 ก.ค.2565 ที่ศูนย์การค้าแฟชั่นไอส์แลนด์ กรุงเทพฯ". เซปัก ตะกร้อ - Sepak Takraw (in Thai). 24 July 2022.

| 28 July; 11:45 | Indonesia | 0-3 | Malaysia | Fashion Island, Bangkok |
| 28 July; 11:45 | Team A: 0-2 (14-21, 16-21); Team B: 0-2 (22-24, 12-21); Team C: 0-2 (13-21, 13-21); R2 Report | | | Fashion Island, Bangkok |

| 28 July; 11:45 | South Korea | 3-0 | Brunei | Fashion Island, Bangkok |
| 28 July; 11:45 | Team A: 2-0 (21-0, 21-0); Team B: 2-0 (21-0, 21-0); Team C: 2-0 (21-0, 21-0); R2 Report | | | Fashion Island, Bangkok |

| 29 July; 13:00 | Indonesia | 0-3 | South Korea | Fashion Island, Bangkok |
| 29 July; 13:00 | Team A: 0-2 (18-21, 15-21); Team B: 0-2 (15-21, 11-21); Team C: 1-2 (22-20, 16-21, 17-21); R2 Report | | | Fashion Island, Bangkok |

| 29 July; 13:00 | Malaysia | 3-0 | Brunei | Fashion Island, Bangkok |
| 29 July; 13:00 | Team A: 2-0 (21-0, 21-0); Team B: 2-0 (21-0, 21-0); Team C: 2-0 (21-0, 21-0); R2 Report | | | Fashion Island, Bangkok |

| 30 July; 09:00 | Indonesia | 3-0 | Brunei | Fashion Island, Bangkok |
| 30 July; 09:00 | Team A: 2-0 (21-0, 21-0); Team B: 2-0 (21-0, 21-0); Team C: 2-0 (21-0, 21-0); R2 Report | | | Fashion Island, Bangkok |

| 30 July; 09:00 | Malaysia | 1-2 | South Korea | Fashion Island, Bangkok |
| 30 July; 09:00 | Team A: 1-2 (16-21, 22-20, 17-21); Team B: 1-2 (19-21, 21-15, 9-21); Team C: 2-0 (21-14, 21-9); R2 Report | | | Fashion Island, Bangkok |

===== MT-PM Final =====
Semifinal
1A | Thailand | 2 | 2 | 2
2B | Malaysia | 0 | 0 | 0
Date: 30 July, 13:00
1B | South Korea | 2 | 2 | 2
2A | Laos | 0 | 0 | 0

Final
Thailand | 2 | 2 | 2
South Korea | 0 | 0 | 0

Winner
Men's Team Regu Premier Division
2022 King's Cup Sepaktakraw World Championship
(Thailand)
Thailand
Thirty-third title

| 30 July; 13:00 | Thailand | 2-0 | Malaysia | Fashion Island, Bangkok |
| 30 July; 13:00 | Team A: 2-0 (21-13, 22-20); Team B: 2-0 (21-10, 21-16); R2 Report | | | Fashion Island, Bangkok |

| 30 July; 13:00 | South Korea | 2-0 | Laos | Fashion Island, Bangkok |
| 30 July; 13:00 | Team A: 2-0 (21-11, 21-14); Team B: 2-0 (21-9, 21-10); R2 Report | | | Fashion Island, Bangkok |

| 31 July; 13:00 | Thailand | 2-0 | South Korea | Fashion Island, Bangkok |
| 31 July; 13:00 | Team A: 2-0 (21-10, 21-16); Team B: 2-0 (21-17, 21-12) | | | Fashion Island, Bangkok |

==== MT Division 1 (MT-D1) ====
===== MT-D1 Group stage =====
Group A

| Pos | Team | Pld | W | L | Pts | SW | SL | SR | SPW | SPL | SPR | Qualification |
|---|---|---|---|---|---|---|---|---|---|---|---|---|
| 1 | Iran | 2 | 2 | 0 | 6 | 12 | 0 | MAX | 252 | 77 | 3.273 | Advance to final round |
| 2 | Oman | 2 | 1 | 1 | 3 | 6 | 6 | 1.000 | 154 | 177 | 0.870 | Advance to final round |
| 3 | Pakistan | 1 | 0 | 1 | 0 | 0 | 12 | 0.000 | 98 | 252 | 0.389 | |

Source: "โปรแกรมแข่งขันตะกร้อ ชิงถ้วยพระราชทาน "คิงส์คัพ"ครั้งที่ 35 ระหว่างวันที่ 24-31 ก.ค.2565 ที่ศูนย์การค้าแฟชั่นไอส์แลนด์ กรุงเทพฯ". เซปัก ตะกร้อ - Sepak Takraw (in Thai). 24 July 2022.

| 27 July; 11:15 | Iran | 3-0 | Pakistan | Fashion Island, Bangkok |
| 27 July; 11:15 | Team A: 2-0 (21-0, 21-0); Team B: 2-0 (21-3, 21-6); Team C: 2-0 (21-4, 21-5); R2 Report | | | Fashion Island, Bangkok |

| 28 July; 9:45 | Pakistan | 0-3 | Oman | Fashion Island, Bangkok |
| 28 July; 9:45 | Team A: 0-2 (11-21, 11-21); Team B: 0-2 (13-21, 13-21); Team C: 0-2 (3-21, 0-21); R2 Report | | | Fashion Island, Bangkok |

| 28 July; 16:00 | Iran | 3-0 | Oman | Fashion Island, Bangkok |
| 28 July; 16:00 | Team A: 2-0 (21-11, 21-2); Team B: 2-0 (21-10, 21-5); Team C: 2-0 (21-0, 21-0); R2 Report | | | Fashion Island, Bangkok |

Group B

| Pos | Team | Pld | W | L | Pts | SW | SL | SR | SPW | SPL | SPR | Qualification |
|---|---|---|---|---|---|---|---|---|---|---|---|---|
| 1 | Japan | 2 | 2 | 0 | 6 | 12 | 0 | MAX | 252 | 74 | 3.405 | Advance to final round |
| 2 | Cambodia | 2 | 1 | 1 | 2 | 5 | 9 | 0.556 | 200 | 168 | 1.190 | Advance to final round |
| 3 | Bangladesh | 2 | 0 | 2 | 1 | 3 | 11 | 0.273 | 42 | 252 | 0.167 | |

Source: "โปรแกรมแข่งขันตะกร้อ ชิงถ้วยพระราชทาน "คิงส์คัพ"ครั้งที่ 35 ระหว่างวันที่ 24-31 ก.ค.2565 ที่ศูนย์การค้าแฟชั่นไอส์แลนด์ กรุงเทพฯ". เซปัก ตะกร้อ - Sepak Takraw (in Thai). 24 July 2022.

| 27 July; 11:15 | Cambodia | 2-1 | Bangladesh | Fashion Island, Bangkok |
| 27 July; 11:15 | Team A: 2-0 (21-14, 21-13); Team B: 1-2 (13-21, 21-19, 17-21); Team C: 2-1 (21-19, 19-21, 21-12); R2 Report | | | Fashion Island, Bangkok |

| 28 July; 9:45 | Bangladesh | 0-3 | Japan | Fashion Island, Bangkok |
| 28 July; 9:45 | Team A: 0-2 (13-21, 6-21); Team B: 0-2 (10-21, 5-21); Team C: 0-2 (4-21, 7-21); R2 Report | | | Fashion Island, Bangkok |

| 28 July; 16:00 | Cambodia | 0-3 | Japan | Fashion Island, Bangkok |
| 28 July; 16:00 | Team A: 0-2 (13-21, 8-21); Team B: 0-2 (14-21, 10-21); Team C: 0-2 (17-21, 12-21); R2 Report | | | Fashion Island, Bangkok |

===== MT-D1 Final =====
Semifinal
1A | Iran | 2 | 2 | 2
2B | Cambodia | 0 | 0 | 0
Date: 29 July, 09:00
1B | Japan | 2 | 2 | 2
2A | Oman | 0 | 0 | 0

Final
Iran | 1 | 0 | 0
Japan | 2 | 2 | 2

Winner
Men's Team Regu Division 1
2022 King's Cup Sepaktakraw World Championship
(Japan)
Japan
First title

| 29 July; 9:00 | Iran | 2-0 | Cambodia | Fashion Island, Bangkok |
| 29 July; 9:00 | Team A: 2-0 (21-11, 21-8); Team B: 2-0 (21-12, 21-12); R2 Report | | | Fashion Island, Bangkok |

| 29 July; 9:00 | Japan | 2-0 | Oman | Fashion Island, Bangkok |
| 29 July; 9:00 | Team A: 2-0 (21-2, 21-8); Team B: 2-0 (21-7, 21-2); R2 Report | | | Fashion Island, Bangkok |

| 30 July; 11:00 | Iran | 0-2 | Japan | Fashion Island, Bangkok |
| 30 July; 11:00 | Team A: 1-2 (21-11, 16-21, 10-21); Team B: 0-2 (12-21, 17-21); R2 Report | | | Fashion Island, Bangkok |

=== Women's team regu (WT) ===
==== WT-PM Group stage ====
Group A

| Pos | Team | Pld | W | L | Pts | SW | SL | SR | SPW | SPL | SPR | Qualification |
|---|---|---|---|---|---|---|---|---|---|---|---|---|
| 1 | Thailand | 3 | 3 | 0 | 9 | 18 | 0 | MAX | 378 | 140 | 2.700 | Advance to final round |
| 2 | South Korea | 3 | 2 | 1 | 6 | 12 | 7 | 1.714 | 327 | 285 | 1.147 | Advance to final round |
| 3 | Laos | 3 | 1 | 2 | 3 | 7 | 13 | 0.538 | 294 | 377 | 0.780 | |
| 4 | India | 3 | 0 | 3 | 0 | 1 | 18 | 0.056 | 217 | 387 | 0.561 | |

Source: "โปรแกรมแข่งขันตะกร้อ ชิงถ้วยพระราชทาน "คิงส์คัพ"ครั้งที่ 35 ระหว่างวันที่ 24-31 ก.ค.2565 ที่ศูนย์การค้าแฟชั่นไอส์แลนด์ กรุงเทพฯ". เซปัก ตะกร้อ - Sepak Takraw (in Thai). 24 July 2022.

| 28 July; 9:45 | Thailand | 3-0 | South Korea | Fashion Island, Bangkok |
| 28 July; 9:45 | Team A: 2-0 (21-12, 21-13); Team B: 2-0 (21-15, 21-9); Team C: 2-0 (21-10, 21-13); R2 Report | | | Fashion Island, Bangkok |

| 28 July; 9:45 | Laos | 3-0 | India | Fashion Island, Bangkok |
| 28 July; 9:45 | Team A: 2-0 (21-15, 21-10); Team B: 2-1 (21-16, 9-21, 21-17); Team C: 2-0 (21-16, 21-17); R2 Report | | | Fashion Island, Bangkok |

| 29 July; 11:00 | Thailand | 3-0 | Laos | Fashion Island, Bangkok |
| 29 July; 11:00 | Team A: 2-0 (21-8, 21-13); Team B: 2-0 (21-9, 21-4); Team C: 2-0 (21-4, 21-3); R2 Report | | | Fashion Island, Bangkok |

| 29 July; 11:00 | South Korea | 3-0 | India | Fashion Island, Bangkok |
| 29 July; 11:00 | Team A: 2-0 (21-13, 21-17); Team B: 2-0 (21-9, 21-11); Team C: 2-0 (21-7, 21-11); R2 Report | | | Fashion Island, Bangkok |

| 29 July; 16:00 | Thailand | 3-0 | India | Fashion Island, Bangkok |
| 29 July; 16:00 | Team A: 2-0 (21-4, 21-10); Team B: 2-0 (21-5, 21-4); Team C: 2-0 (21-7, 21-7); R2 Report | | | Fashion Island, Bangkok |

| 29 July; 16:00 | South Korea | 3-0 | Laos | Fashion Island, Bangkok |
| 29 July; 16:00 | Team A: 2-1 (21-13, 13-21, 21-10); Team B: 2-0 (21-17, 21-11); Team C: 2-0 (21-6, 21-13); R2 Report | | | Fashion Island, Bangkok |

Group B

| Pos | Team | Pld | W | L | Pts | SW | SL | SR | SPW | SPL | SPR | Qualification |
|---|---|---|---|---|---|---|---|---|---|---|---|---|
| 1 | Vietnam | 3 | 3 | 0 | 9 | 18 | 0 | MAX | 378 | 167 | 2.263 | Advance to final round |
| 2 | Indonesia | 3 | 2 | 1 | 5 | 11 | 9 | 1.222 | 335 | 313 | 1.070 | Advance to final round |
| 3 | Japan | 3 | 1 | 2 | 4 | 9 | 11 | 0.818 | 325 | 344 | 0.945 | |
| 4 | Cambodia | 3 | 0 | 3 | 0 | 0 | 18 | 0.000 | 154 | 378 | 0.407 | |

Source: "โปรแกรมแข่งขันตะกร้อ ชิงถ้วยพระราชทาน "คิงส์คัพ"ครั้งที่ 35 ระหว่างวันที่ 24-31 ก.ค.2565 ที่ศูนย์การค้าแฟชั่นไอส์แลนด์ กรุงเทพฯ". เซปัก ตะกร้อ - Sepak Takraw (in Thai). 24 July 2022.

| 27 July; 12:00 | Vietnam | 3-0 | Indonesia | Fashion Island, Bangkok |
| 27 July; 12:00 | Team A: 2-0 (21-9, 21-9); Team B: 2-0 (21-15, 21-17); Team C: 2-0 (21-11, 21-4); R2 Report | | | Fashion Island, Bangkok |

| 27 July; 12:00 | Japan | 3-0 | Cambodia | Fashion Island, Bangkok |
| 27 July; 12:00 | Team A: 2-0 (21-8, 21-11); Team B: 2-0 (21-13, 21-14); Team C: 2-0 (21-16, 21-12); R2 Report | | | Fashion Island, Bangkok |

| 27 July; 16:00 | Vietnam | 3-0 | Japan | Fashion Island, Bangkok |
| 27 July; 16:00 | Team A: 2-0 (21-17, 21-3); Team B: 2-0 (21-7, 21-14); Team C: 2-0 (21-9, 21-8); R2 Report | | | Fashion Island, Bangkok |

| 28 July; 16:00 | Indonesia | 3-0 | Cambodia | Fashion Island, Bangkok |
| 28 July; 16:00 | Team A: 2-0 (21-10, 21-13); Team B: 2-0 (21-10, 21-7); Team C: 2-0 (21-4, 21-2); R2 Report | | | Fashion Island, Bangkok |

| 29 July; 9:00 | Indonesia | 2-1 | Japan | Fashion Island, Bangkok |
| 29 July; 9:00 | Team A: 2-0 (21-19, 21-13); Team B: 2-1 (10-21, 21-13, 21-18); Team C: 1-2 (21-15, 13-21, 16-21); R2 Report | | | Fashion Island, Bangkok |

| 29 July; 13:00 | Vietnam | 3-0 | Cambodia | Fashion Island, Bangkok |
| 29 July; 13:00 | Team A: 2-0 (21-6, 21-8); Team B: 2-0 (21-9, 21-10); Team C: 2-0 (21-3, 21-8); R2 Report | | | Fashion Island, Bangkok |

==== WT-PM Final ====
Semifinal
1A | Thailand | 2 | 2 | 2
2B | Indonesia | 0 | 0 | 0
Date: 30 July, 11:00
1B | Vietnam | 2 | 2 | 2
2A | South Korea | 0 | 0 | 0

Final
Thailand | 2 | 2 | 2
Vietnam | 1 | 0 | 0

Winner
Women's Team Regu Premier Division
2022 King's Cup Sepaktakraw World Championship
(Thailand)
THailand
Twenty-second title

| 30 July; 11:00 | Thailand | 2-0 | Indonesia | Fashion Island, Bangkok |
| 30 July; 11:00 | Team A: 2-0 (21-9, 21-11); Team B: 2-0 (21-7, 21-9); R2 Report | | | Fashion Island, Bangkok |

| 30 July; 11:00 | Vietnam | 2-0 | South Korea | Fashion Island, Bangkok |
| 30 July; 11:00 | Team A: 2-0 (21-14, 21-14); Team B: 2-0 (21-16, 23-21); R2 Report | | | Fashion Island, Bangkok |

| 30 July; 16:45 | Thailand | 2-0 | Vietnam | Fashion Island, Bangkok |
| 30 July; 16:45 | Team A: 2-1 (15-21, 21-13, 21-12); Team B: 2-0 (21-13, 21-12); R2 Report | | | Fashion Island, Bangkok |

== Quad ==
=== Men's Quad (MQ) ===
==== MQ Premier division (MQ-PM) ====
===== MQ-PM Group stage =====
Group A

| Pos | Team | Pld | W | L | Pts | SW | SL | SR | SPW | SPL | SPR | Qualification |
|---|---|---|---|---|---|---|---|---|---|---|---|---|
| 1 | South Korea | 3 | 3 | 0 | 8 | 6 | 1 | 6.000 | 138 | 84 | 1.643 | Advance to final round |
| 2 | Myanmar | 3 | 2 | 1 | 5 | 4 | 3 | 1.333 | 124 | 112 | 1.107 | Advance to final round |
| 3 | India | 3 | 1 | 2 | 5 | 4 | 4 | 1.000 | 151 | 127 | 1.189 | |
| 4 | Sri Lanka | 3 | 0 | 3 | 0 | 0 | 6 | 0.000 | 36 | 126 | 0.286 | |

Source: "โปรแกรมแข่งขันตะกร้อ ชิงถ้วยพระราชทาน "คิงส์คัพ"ครั้งที่ 35 ระหว่างวันที่ 24-31 ก.ค.2565 ที่ศูนย์การค้าแฟชั่นไอส์แลนด์ กรุงเทพฯ". เซปัก ตะกร้อ - Sepak Takraw (in Thai). 24 July 2022.

| 24 July; 12:00 | Myanmar | 0-2 | South Korea | Fashion Island, Bangkok |
| 24 July; 12:00 | (10-21, 11-21); R2 Report | | | Fashion Island, Bangkok |

| 24 July; 12:00 | Sri Lanka | 0-2 | India | Fashion Island, Bangkok |
| 24 July; 12:00 | (6-21, 6-21); R2 Report | | | Fashion Island, Bangkok |

| 25 July; 13:30 | Myanmar | 2-0 | Sri Lanka | Fashion Island, Bangkok |
| 25 July; 13:30 | (21-10, 21-5); R2 Report | | | Fashion Island, Bangkok |

| 25 July; 13:30 | South Korea | 2-1 | India | Fashion Island, Bangkok |
| 25 July; 13:30 | (12-21, 21-18, 21-15); R2 Report | | | Fashion Island, Bangkok |

| 26 July; 12:00 | Myanmar | 2-1 | India | Fashion Island, Bangkok |
| 26 July; 12:00 | (21-18, 19-21, 21-16); R2 Report | | | Fashion Island, Bangkok |

| 26 July; 12:00 | South Korea | 2-0 | Sri Lanka | Fashion Island, Bangkok |
| 26 July; 12:00 | (21-5, 21-4); R2 Report | | | Fashion Island, Bangkok |

Group B

| Pos | Team | Pld | W | L | Pts | SW | SL | SR | SPW | SPL | SPR | Qualification |
|---|---|---|---|---|---|---|---|---|---|---|---|---|
| 1 | Vietnam | 3 | 3 | 0 | 8 | 6 | 1 | 6.000 | 149 | 108 | 1.380 | Advance to final round |
| 2 | Japan | 3 | 2 | 1 | 6 | 4 | 2 | 2.000 | 113 | 81 | 1.395 | Advance to final round |
| 3 | Indonesia | 3 | 1 | 2 | 4 | 3 | 4 | 0.750 | 114 | 131 | 0.870 | |
| 4 | Chinese Taipei | 3 | 0 | 3 | 0 | 0 | 6 | 0.000 | 70 | 126 | 0.556 | |

Source: "โปรแกรมแข่งขันตะกร้อ ชิงถ้วยพระราชทาน "คิงส์คัพ"ครั้งที่ 35 ระหว่างวันที่ 24-31 ก.ค.2565 ที่ศูนย์การค้าแฟชั่นไอส์แลนด์ กรุงเทพฯ". เซปัก ตะกร้อ - Sepak Takraw (in Thai). 24 July 2022.

| 25 July; 09:00 | Indonesia | 1-2 | Vietnam | Fashion Island, Bangkok |
| 25 July; 09:00 | (9-21, 21-19, 23-25); R2 Report | | | Fashion Island, Bangkok |

| 25 July; 09:00 | Chinese Taipei | 0-2 | Japan | Fashion Island, Bangkok |
| 25 July; 09:00 | (9-21, 11-21); R2 Report | | | Fashion Island, Bangkok |

| 25 July; 16:30 | Indonesia | 2-0 | Chinese Taipei | Fashion Island, Bangkok |
| 25 July; 16:30 | (21-11, 21-13); R2 Report | | | Fashion Island, Bangkok |

| 25 July; 16:30 | Vietnam | 2-0 | Japan | Fashion Island, Bangkok |
| 25 July; 16:30 | (21-14, 21-15); R2 Report | | | Fashion Island, Bangkok |

| 26 July; 14:15 | Indonesia | 0-2 | Japan | Fashion Island, Bangkok |
| 26 July; 14:15 | (13-21, 6-21); R2 Report | | | Fashion Island, Bangkok |

| 26 July; 14:15 | Chinese Taipei | 0-2 | Vietnam | Fashion Island, Bangkok |
| 26 July; 14:15 | (16-21, 10-21); R2 Report | | | Fashion Island, Bangkok |

===== MQ-PM Final =====
Semifinal
1A | South Korea | 15 | 21 | 21 | 2
2B | Japan | 21 | 18 | 16 | 1
Date: 26 July, 17:15 Report
1B | Vietnam | 21 | 21 | - | 2
2A | Myanmar | 15 | 15 | - | 0

Final
South Korea | 21 | 21 | - | 2
Vietnam | 15 | 12 | - | 0

Winner
Men's Quad Premier Division
2022 King's Cup Sepaktakraw World Championship
(South Korea)
South Korea
First title

==== MQ Division 1 (MQ-D1) ====
===== MQ-D1 Group stage =====
Group A

| Pos | Team | Pld | W | L | Pts | SW | SL | SR | SPW | SPL | SPR | Qualification |
|---|---|---|---|---|---|---|---|---|---|---|---|---|
| 1 | Cambodia | 3 | 3 | 0 | 9 | 6 | 0 | MAX | 126 | 92 | 1.370 | Advance to final round |
| 2 | Nepal | 3 | 2 | 1 | 5 | 4 | 3 | 1.333 | 135 | 118 | 1.144 | Advance to final round |
| 3 | Iraq | 3 | 1 | 2 | 3 | 2 | 4 | 0.500 | 97 | 115 | 0.843 | |
| 4 | Australia | 3 | 0 | 3 | 1 | 1 | 6 | 0.167 | 109 | 142 | 0.768 | |

Source: "โปรแกรมแข่งขันตะกร้อ ชิงถ้วยพระราชทาน "คิงส์คัพ"ครั้งที่ 35 ระหว่างวันที่ 24-31 ก.ค.2565 ที่ศูนย์การค้าแฟชั่นไอส์แลนด์ กรุงเทพฯ". เซปัก ตะกร้อ - Sepak Takraw (in Thai). 24 July 2022.

| 24 July; 09:00 | Cambodia | 2-0 | Australia | Fashion Island, Bangkok |
| 24 July; 09:00 | (21-10, 21-17); R2 Report | | | Fashion Island, Bangkok |

| 24 July; 09:00 | Iraq | 0-2 | Nepal | Fashion Island, Bangkok |
| 24 July; 09:00 | (7-21, 18-21); R2 Report | | | Fashion Island, Bangkok |

| 25 July; 09:45 | Cambodia | 2-0 | Iraq | Fashion Island, Bangkok |
| 25 July; 09:45 | (21-13, 21-17); R2 Report | | | Fashion Island, Bangkok |

| 25 July; 09:45 | Australia | 1-2 | Nepal | Fashion Island, Bangkok |
| 25 July; 09:45 | (15-21, 21-16, 15-21); R2 Report | | | Fashion Island, Bangkok |

| 25 July; 17:30 | Cambodia | 2-0 | Nepal | Fashion Island, Bangkok |
| 25 July; 17:30 | (21-19, 21-16); R2 Report | | | Fashion Island, Bangkok |

| 25 July; 17:30 | Australia | 0-2 | Iraq | Fashion Island, Bangkok |
| 25 July; 17:30 | (13-21, 18-21); R2 Report | | | Fashion Island, Bangkok |

Group B

| Pos | Team | Pld | W | L | Pts | SW | SL | SR | SPW | SPL | SPR | Qualification |
|---|---|---|---|---|---|---|---|---|---|---|---|---|
| 1 | Iran | 3 | 3 | 0 | 9 | 6 | 0 | MAX | 126 | 49 | 2.571 | Advance to final round |
| 2 | Bangladesh | 3 | 2 | 1 | 6 | 4 | 2 | 2.000 | 104 | 101 | 1.030 | Advance to final round |
| 3 | New Zealand | 3 | 1 | 2 | 3 | 2 | 4 | 0.500 | 101 | 107 | 0.944 | |
| 4 | Pakistan | 3 | 0 | 3 | 0 | 0 | 6 | 0.000 | 52 | 126 | 0.413 | |

Source: "โปรแกรมแข่งขันตะกร้อ ชิงถ้วยพระราชทาน "คิงส์คัพ"ครั้งที่ 35 ระหว่างวันที่ 24-31 ก.ค.2565 ที่ศูนย์การค้าแฟชั่นไอส์แลนด์ กรุงเทพฯ". เซปัก ตะกร้อ - Sepak Takraw (in Thai). 24 July 2022.

| 24 July; 11:15 | Iran | 2-0 | New Zealand | Fashion Island, Bangkok |
| 24 July; 11:15 | (21-7, 21-13); R2 Report | | | Fashion Island, Bangkok |

| 24 July; 11:15 | Bangladesh | 2-0 | Pakistan | Fashion Island, Bangkok |
| 24 July; 11:15 | (21-11, 21-9); R2 Report | | | Fashion Island, Bangkok |

| 25 July; 16:00 | Iran | 2-0 | Bangladesh | Fashion Island, Bangkok |
| 25 July; 16:00 | (21-11, 21-7); R2 Report | | | Fashion Island, Bangkok |

| 25 July; 16:00 | New Zealand | 2-0 | Pakistan | Fashion Island, Bangkok |
| 25 July; 16:00 | (21-13, 21-8); R2 Report | | | Fashion Island, Bangkok |

| 26 July; 09:45 | Iran | 2-0 | Pakistan | Fashion Island, Bangkok |
| 26 July; 09:45 | (21-5, 21-6); R2 Report | | | Fashion Island, Bangkok |

| 26 July; 09:45 | New Zealand | 0-2 | Bangladesh | Fashion Island, Bangkok |
| 26 July; 09:45 | (21-23, 18-21); R2 Report | | | Fashion Island, Bangkok |

===== MQ-D1 Final =====
Semifinal
1A | Cambodia | 21 | 21 | 2
2B | Bangladesh | 11 | 11 | 0
Date: 26 July, 17:15 Report
1B | Iran | 21 | 21 | 2
2A | Nepal | 10 | 16 | 0

Final
Cambodia | 13 | 11 | 0
Iran | 21 | 21 | 2

Winner
Men's Quad Division 1
2022 King's Cup Sepaktakraw World Championship
(Iran)
Iran
First title

=== Women's Quad (WQ) ===
==== WQ-PM Group stage ====
Group A

| Pos | Team | Pld | W | L | Pts | SW | SL | SR | SPW | SPL | SPR | Qualification |
|---|---|---|---|---|---|---|---|---|---|---|---|---|
| 1 | Thailand | 3 | 3 | 0 | 9 | 6 | 0 | MAX | 126 | 40 | 3.150 | Advance to final round |
| 2 | Japan | 3 | 2 | 1 | 6 | 4 | 2 | 2.000 | 108 | 84 | 1.286 | |
| 3 | Chinese Taipei | 3 | 1 | 2 | 3 | 2 | 4 | 0.500 | 83 | 100 | 0.830 | |
| 4 | Sri Lanka | 3 | 0 | 3 | 0 | 0 | 6 | 0.000 | 33 | 126 | 0.262 | |

Source: "โปรแกรมแข่งขันตะกร้อ ชิงถ้วยพระราชทาน "คิงส์คัพ"ครั้งที่ 35 ระหว่างวันที่ 24-31 ก.ค.2565 ที่ศูนย์การค้าแฟชั่นไอส์แลนด์ กรุงเทพฯ". เซปัก ตะกร้อ - Sepak Takraw (in Thai). 24 July 2022.

| 24 July; 16:30 | Thailand | 2-0 | Japan | Fashion Island, Bangkok |
| 24 July; 16:30 | (21-17, 21-7); R2 Report | | | Fashion Island, Bangkok |

| 24 July; 18:00 | Chinese Taipei | 2-0 | Sri Lanka | Fashion Island, Bangkok |
| 24 July; 18:00 | (21-9, 21-7); R2 Report | | | Fashion Island, Bangkok |

| 24 July; 21:00 | Thailand | 2-0 | Sri Lanka | Fashion Island, Bangkok |
| 24 July; 21:00 | (21-1, 21-5); R2 Report | | | Fashion Island, Bangkok |

| 24 July; 21:00 | Japan | 2-0 | Chinese Taipei | Fashion Island, Bangkok |
| 24 July; 21:00 | (21-13, 21-18); R2 Report | | | Fashion Island, Bangkok |

| 25 July; 12:00 | Thailand | 2-0 | Chinese Taipei | Fashion Island, Bangkok |
| 25 July; 12:00 | (21-7, 21-3); R2 Report | | | Fashion Island, Bangkok |

| 25 July; 12:00 | Japan | 2-0 | Sri Lanka | Fashion Island, Bangkok |
| 25 July; 12:00 | (21-5, 21-6); R2 Report | | | Fashion Island, Bangkok |

Group B

| Pos | Team | Pld | W | L | Pts | SW | SL | SR | SPW | SPL | SPR | Qualification |
|---|---|---|---|---|---|---|---|---|---|---|---|---|
| 1 | Vietnam | 3 | 3 | 0 | 9 | 6 | 0 | MAX | 126 | 29 | 4.345 | Advance to final round |
| 2 | Malaysia | 3 | 2 | 1 | 6 | 4 | 2 | 2.000 | 106 | 66 | 1.606 | |
| 3 | Cambodia | 3 | 1 | 2 | 3 | 2 | 4 | 0.500 | 64 | 93 | 0.688 | |
| 4 | Pakistan | 3 | 0 | 3 | 0 | 0 | 6 | 0.000 | 18 | 126 | 0.143 | |

Source: "โปรแกรมแข่งขันตะกร้อ ชิงถ้วยพระราชทาน "คิงส์คัพ"ครั้งที่ 35 ระหว่างวันที่ 24-31 ก.ค.2565 ที่ศูนย์การค้าแฟชั่นไอส์แลนด์ กรุงเทพฯ". เซปัก ตะกร้อ - Sepak Takraw (in Thai). 24 July 2022.

| 24 July; 9:45 | Vietnam | 2-0 | Pakistan | Fashion Island, Bangkok |
| 24 July; 9:45 | (21-0, 21-0); R2 Report | | | Fashion Island, Bangkok |

| 24 July; 9:45 | Malaysia | 2-0 | Cambodia | Fashion Island, Bangkok |
| 24 July; 9:45 | (21-13, 21-2); R2 Report | | | Fashion Island, Bangkok |

| 24 July; 18:45 | Vietnam | 2-0 | Malaysia | Fashion Island, Bangkok |
| 24 July; 18:45 | (21-4, 21-18); R2 Report | | | Fashion Island, Bangkok |

| 24 July; 18:45 | Cambodia | 2-0 | Pakistan | Fashion Island, Bangkok |
| 24 July; 18:45 | (21-4, 21-5); R2 Report | | | Fashion Island, Bangkok |

| 25 July; 12:45 | Vietnam | 2-0 | Cambodia | Fashion Island, Bangkok |
| 25 July; 12:45 | (21-4, 21-3); R2 Report | | | Fashion Island, Bangkok |

| 25 July; 12:45 | Malaysia | 2-0 | Pakistan | Fashion Island, Bangkok |
| 25 July; 12:45 | (21-4, 21-5); R2 Report | | | Fashion Island, Bangkok |

Group C

| Pos | Team | Pld | W | L | Pts | SW | SL | SR | SPW | SPL | SPR | Qualification |
|---|---|---|---|---|---|---|---|---|---|---|---|---|
| 1 | Indonesia | 2 | 2 | 0 | 6 | 4 | 0 | MAX | 84 | 42 | 2.000 | Advance to final round |
| 2 | Myanmar | 2 | 1 | 1 | 3 | 2 | 2 | 1.000 | 73 | 57 | 1.281 | |
| 3 | Iraq | 2 | 0 | 2 | 0 | 0 | 4 | 0.000 | 26 | 84 | 0.310 | |

Source: "โปรแกรมแข่งขันตะกร้อ ชิงถ้วยพระราชทาน "คิงส์คัพ"ครั้งที่ 35 ระหว่างวันที่ 24-31 ก.ค.2565 ที่ศูนย์การค้าแฟชั่นไอส์แลนด์ กรุงเทพฯ". เซปัก ตะกร้อ - Sepak Takraw (in Thai). 24 July 2022.

| 24 July; 10:30 | Myanmar | 2-0 | Iraq | Fashion Island, Bangkok |
| 24 July; 10:30 | (21-7, 21-8); R2 Report | | | Fashion Island, Bangkok |

| 24 July; 19:30 | Myanmar | 0-2 | Indonesia | Fashion Island, Bangkok |
| 24 July; 19:30 | (15-21, 16-21); R2 Report | | | Fashion Island, Bangkok |

| 25 July; 13:00 | Indonesia | 2-0 | Iraq | Fashion Island, Bangkok |
| 25 July; 13:00 | (21-5, 21-6); R2 Report | | | Fashion Island, Bangkok |

Group D

| Pos | Team | Pld | W | L | Pts | SW | SL | SR | SPW | SPL | SPR | Qualification |
|---|---|---|---|---|---|---|---|---|---|---|---|---|
| 1 | South Korea | 2 | 2 | 0 | 5 | 4 | 1 | 4.000 | 100 | 67 | 1.493 | Advance to final round |
| 2 | Laos | 2 | 1 | 1 | 4 | 3 | 2 | 1.500 | 89 | 84 | 1.060 | |
| 3 | Iran | 2 | 0 | 2 | 0 | 0 | 4 | 0.000 | 46 | 84 | 0.548 | |

Source: "โปรแกรมแข่งขันตะกร้อ ชิงถ้วยพระราชทาน "คิงส์คัพ"ครั้งที่ 35 ระหว่างวันที่ 24-31 ก.ค.2565 ที่ศูนย์การค้าแฟชั่นไอส์แลนด์ กรุงเทพฯ". เซปัก ตะกร้อ - Sepak Takraw (in Thai). 24 July 2022.

| 24 July; 10:30 | Laos | 2-0 | Iran | Fashion Island, Bangkok |
| 24 July; 10:30 | (21-9, 21-17); R2 Report | | | Fashion Island, Bangkok |

| 24 July; 19:30 | Laos | 1-2 | South Korea | Fashion Island, Bangkok |
| 24 July; 19:30 | (21-16, 8-21, 18-21); R2 Report | | | Fashion Island, Bangkok |

| 25 July; 13:00 | South Korea | 2-0 | Iran | Fashion Island, Bangkok |
| 25 July; 13:00 | (21-10, 21-10); R2 Report | | | Fashion Island, Bangkok |

==== WQ-PM Final ====
Semifinal
1A | Thailand | 21 | 21 | 2
1C | Indonesia | 9 | 8 | 0
Date: 26 July, 12:45 Report
1B | Vietnam | 21 | 21 | 2
1D | South Korea | 16 | 19 | 0

Final
Thailand | 15 | 21 | 0
Vietnam | 21 | 23 | 2

Winner
Women's Quad Premier Division
2022 King's Cup Sepaktakraw World Championship
(Vietnam)
Vietnam
First title

== Doubles ==
=== Men's doubles (MD) ===
==== MD-PM Group stage ====
Group A

| Pos | Team | Pld | W | L | Pts | SW | SL | SR | SPW | SPL | SPR | Qualification |
|---|---|---|---|---|---|---|---|---|---|---|---|---|
| 1 | Myanmar | 3 | 3 | 0 | 9 | 6 | 0 | MAX | 126 | 39 | 3.231 | Advance to final round |
| 2 | Australia | 3 | 2 | 1 | 6 | 4 | 2 | 2.000 | 102 | 65 | 1.569 | |
| 3 | Sri Lanka | 3 | 1 | 2 | 3 | 2 | 4 | 0.500 | 86 | 112 | 0.768 | |
| 4 | Brazil | 3 | 0 | 3 | 0 | 0 | 6 | 0.000 | 28 | 126 | 0.222 | |

Source: "โปรแกรมแข่งขันตะกร้อ ชิงถ้วยพระราชทาน "คิงส์คัพ"ครั้งที่ 35 ระหว่างวันที่ 24-31 ก.ค.2565 ที่ศูนย์การค้าแฟชั่นไอส์แลนด์ กรุงเทพฯ". เซปัก ตะกร้อ - Sepak Takraw (in Thai). 24 July 2022.

| 26 July; 10:30 | Myanmar | 2-0 | Australia | Fashion Island, Bangkok |
| 26 July; 10:30 | (21-9, 21-9); R2 Report | | | Fashion Island, Bangkok |

| 26 July; 10:30 | Brazil | 0-2 | Sri Lanka | Fashion Island, Bangkok |
| 26 July; 10:30 | (14-21, 14-21); R2 Report | | | Fashion Island, Bangkok |

| 26 July; 15:00 | Myanmar | 2-0 | Brazil | Fashion Island, Bangkok |
| 26 July; 15:00 | (21-0, 21-0); R2 Report | | | Fashion Island, Bangkok |

| 26 July; 15:00 | Australia | 2-0 | Sri Lanka | Fashion Island, Bangkok |
| 26 July; 15:00 | (21-13, 21-10); R2 Report | | | Fashion Island, Bangkok |

| 27 July; 9:45 | Myanmar | 2-0 | Sri Lanka | Fashion Island, Bangkok |
| 27 July; 9:45 | (21-10, 21-11); R2 Report | | | Fashion Island, Bangkok |

| 27 July; 9:45 | Australia | 2-0 | Brazil | Fashion Island, Bangkok |
| 27 July; 9:45 | (21-0, 21-0); R2 Report | | | Fashion Island, Bangkok |

Group B

| Pos | Team | Pld | W | L | Pts | SW | SL | SR | SPW | SPL | SPR | Qualification |
|---|---|---|---|---|---|---|---|---|---|---|---|---|
| 1 | Indonesia | 3 | 3 | 0 | 9 | 6 | 0 | MAX | 126 | 41 | 3.073 | Advance to final round |
| 2 | Chinese Taipei | 3 | 2 | 1 | 6 | 4 | 2 | 2.000 | 96 | 95 | 1.011 | |
| 3 | Iraq | 3 | 1 | 2 | 3 | 2 | 4 | 0.500 | 90 | 115 | 0.783 | |
| 4 | Switzerland | 3 | 0 | 3 | 0 | 0 | 6 | 0.000 | 66 | 126 | 0.524 | |

Source: "โปรแกรมแข่งขันตะกร้อ ชิงถ้วยพระราชทาน "คิงส์คัพ"ครั้งที่ 35 ระหว่างวันที่ 24-31 ก.ค.2565 ที่ศูนย์การค้าแฟชั่นไอส์แลนด์ กรุงเทพฯ". เซปัก ตะกร้อ - Sepak Takraw (in Thai). 24 July 2022.

| 26 July; 10:30 | Indonesia | 2-0 | Chinese Taipei | Fashion Island, Bangkok |
| 26 July; 10:30 | (21-7, 21-5); R2 Report | | | Fashion Island, Bangkok |

| 26 July; 10:30 | Iraq | 2-0 | Switzerland | Fashion Island, Bangkok |
| 26 July; 10:30 | (21-18, 21-13); R2 Report | | | Fashion Island, Bangkok |

| 26 July; 15:45 | Indonesia | 2-0 | Iraq | Fashion Island, Bangkok |
| 26 July; 15:45 | (21-6, 21-10); R2 Report | | | Fashion Island, Bangkok |

| 26 July; 15:45 | Chinese Taipei | 2-0 | Switzerland | Fashion Island, Bangkok |
| 26 July; 15:45 | (21-12, 21-9); R2 Report | | | Fashion Island, Bangkok |

| 27 July; 9:45 | Indonesia | 2-0 | Switzerland | Fashion Island, Bangkok |
| 27 July; 9:45 | (21-11, 21-3); R2 Report | | | Fashion Island, Bangkok |

| 27 July; 9:45 | Chinese Taipei | 2-0 | Iraq | Fashion Island, Bangkok |
| 27 July; 9:45 | (21-16, 21-16); R2 Report | | | Fashion Island, Bangkok |

Group C

| Pos | Team | Pld | W | L | Pts | SW | SL | SR | SPW | SPL | SPR | Qualification |
|---|---|---|---|---|---|---|---|---|---|---|---|---|
| 1 | Laos | 2 | 2 | 0 | 6 | 4 | 0 | MAX | 84 | 36 | 2.333 | Advance to final round |
| 2 | New Zealand | 2 | 1 | 1 | 3 | 2 | 2 | 1.000 | 62 | 76 | 0.816 | |
| 3 | Oman | 2 | 0 | 2 | 0 | 0 | 4 | 0.000 | 51 | 85 | 0.600 | |

Source: "โปรแกรมแข่งขันตะกร้อ ชิงถ้วยพระราชทาน "คิงส์คัพ"ครั้งที่ 35 ระหว่างวันที่ 24-31 ก.ค.2565 ที่ศูนย์การค้าแฟชั่นไอส์แลนด์ กรุงเทพฯ". เซปัก ตะกร้อ - Sepak Takraw (in Thai). 24 July 2022.

| 26 July; 11:15 | Laos | 2-0 | Oman | Fashion Island, Bangkok |
| 26 July; 11:15 | (21-7, 21-10); R2 Report | | | Fashion Island, Bangkok |

| 26 July; 15:45 | Oman | 0-2 | New Zealand | Fashion Island, Bangkok |
| 26 July; 15:45 | (20-22, 14-21); R2 Report | | | Fashion Island, Bangkok |

| 27 July; 10:30 | Laos | 2-0 | New Zealand | Fashion Island, Bangkok |
| 27 July; 10:30 | (21-6, 21-13); R2 Report | | | Fashion Island, Bangkok |

Group D

| Pos | Team | Pld | W | L | Pts | SW | SL | SR | SPW | SPL | SPR | Qualification |
|---|---|---|---|---|---|---|---|---|---|---|---|---|
| 1 | Malaysia | 2 | 2 | 0 | 6 | 4 | 0 | MAX | 84 | 38 | 2.211 | Advance to final round |
| 2 | Vietnam | 2 | 1 | 1 | 3 | 2 | 2 | 1.000 | 69 | 56 | 1.232 | |
| 3 | Nepal | 2 | 0 | 2 | 0 | 0 | 4 | 0.000 | 25 | 84 | 0.298 | |

Source: "โปรแกรมแข่งขันตะกร้อ ชิงถ้วยพระราชทาน "คิงส์คัพ"ครั้งที่ 35 ระหว่างวันที่ 24-31 ก.ค.2565 ที่ศูนย์การค้าแฟชั่นไอส์แลนด์ กรุงเทพฯ". เซปัก ตะกร้อ - Sepak Takraw (in Thai). 24 July 2022.

| 26 July; 11:15 | Malaysia | 2-0 | Vietnam | Fashion Island, Bangkok |
| 26 July; 11:15 | (21-13, 21-14); R2 Report | | | Fashion Island, Bangkok |

| 26 July; 15:45 | Vietnam | 2-0 | Nepal | Fashion Island, Bangkok |
| 26 July; 15:45 | (21-10, 21-4); R2 Report | | | Fashion Island, Bangkok |

| 27 July; 10:30 | Malaysia | 2-0 | Nepal | Fashion Island, Bangkok |
| 27 July; 10:30 | (21-7, 21-4); R2 Report | | | Fashion Island, Bangkok |

==== MD-PM Final ====
Semifinal
1A | Myanmar | 13 | 18 | - | 0
1C | Laos | 21 | 21 | - | 2
Date: 29 July, 16:45 Report
1B | Indonesia | 11 | 21 | 18 | 1
1D | Malaysia | 21 | 18 | 21 | 2

Final
Laos | 24 | 21 | 18 | 1
Malaysia | 25 | 14 | 21 | 2

Winner
Men's Double Premier Division
2022 King's Cup Sepaktakraw World Championship
(Malaysia)
Malaysia
First title

=== Women's doubles (WD) ===
==== WD-PM Group stage ====
Group A

| Pos | Team | Pld | W | L | Pts | SW | SL | SR | SPW | SPL | SPR | Qualification |
|---|---|---|---|---|---|---|---|---|---|---|---|---|
| 1 | Indonesia | 4 | 4 | 0 | 11 | 8 | 1 | 8.000 | 188 | 68 | 2.765 | Advance to final round |
| 2 | Myanmar | 4 | 3 | 1 | 10 | 7 | 2 | 3.500 | 169 | 107 | 1.579 | Advance to final round |
| 3 | Sri Lanka | 4 | 2 | 2 | 6 | 4 | 4 | 1.000 | 117 | 141 | 0.830 | |
| 4 | Iraq | 4 | 1 | 3 | 3 | 2 | 6 | 0.333 | 80 | 148 | 0.541 | |
| 5 | Pakistan | 4 | 0 | 4 | 0 | 0 | 8 | 0.000 | 78 | 168 | 0.464 | |

Source: "โปรแกรมแข่งขันตะกร้อ ชิงถ้วยพระราชทาน "คิงส์คัพ"ครั้งที่ 35 ระหว่างวันที่ 24-31 ก.ค.2565 ที่ศูนย์การค้าแฟชั่นไอส์แลนด์ กรุงเทพฯ". เซปัก ตะกร้อ - Sepak Takraw (in Thai). 24 July 2022.

| 26 July; 9:00 | Myanmar | 1-2 | Indonesia | Fashion Island, Bangkok |
| 26 July; 9:00 | (11-21, 22-20, 10-21); R2 Report | | | Fashion Island, Bangkok |

| 26 July; 9:00 | Iraq | 2-0 | Pakistan | Fashion Island, Bangkok |
| 26 July; 9:00 | (21-9, 21-13); R2 Report | | | Fashion Island, Bangkok |

| 26 July; 14:15 | Indonesia | 2-0 | Iraq | Fashion Island, Bangkok |
| 26 July; 14:15 | (21-4, 21-3); R2 Report | | | Fashion Island, Bangkok |

| 26 July; 14:15 | Pakistan | 0-2 | Sri Lanka | Fashion Island, Bangkok |
| 26 July; 14:15 | (10-21, 16-21); R2 Report | | | Fashion Island, Bangkok |

| 27 July; 9:00 | Myanmar | 2-0 | Pakistan | Fashion Island, Bangkok |
| 27 July; 9:00 | (21-13, 21-7); R2 Report | | | Fashion Island, Bangkok |

| 27 July; 9:00 | Iraq | 0-2 | Sri Lanka | Fashion Island, Bangkok |
| 27 July; 9:00 | (16-21, 15-21); R2 Report | | | Fashion Island, Bangkok |

| 27 July; 13:15 | Myanmar | 2-0 | Sri Lanka | Fashion Island, Bangkok |
| 27 July; 13:15 | (21-8, 21-17); R2 Report | | | Fashion Island, Bangkok |

| 27 July; 13:15 | Indonesia | 2-0 | Pakistan | Fashion Island, Bangkok |
| 27 July; 13:15 | (21-5, 21-5); R2 Report | | | Fashion Island, Bangkok |

| 28 July; 13:45 | Myanmar | 2-0 | Iraq | Fashion Island, Bangkok |
| 28 July; 13:45 | 21-0, 21-0; R2 Report | | | Fashion Island, Bangkok |

| 28 July; 13:45 | Indonesia | 2-0 | Sri Lanka | Fashion Island, Bangkok |
| 28 July; 13:45 | 21-6, 21-2; R2 Report | | | Fashion Island, Bangkok |

Group B

| Pos | Team | Pld | W | L | Pts | SW | SL | SR | SPW | SPL | SPR | Qualification |
|---|---|---|---|---|---|---|---|---|---|---|---|---|
| 1 | Laos | 4 | 4 | 0 | 12 | 8 | 0 | MAX | 168 | 45 | 3.733 | Advance to final round |
| 2 | Malaysia | 4 | 3 | 1 | 9 | 6 | 2 | 3.000 | 145 | 102 | 1.422 | Advance to final round |
| 3 | Chinese Taipei | 4 | 2 | 2 | 5 | 4 | 5 | 0.800 | 121 | 156 | 0.776 | |
| 4 | Iran | 4 | 1 | 3 | 4 | 3 | 6 | 0.500 | 120 | 170 | 0.706 | |
| 5 | Nepal | 4 | 0 | 4 | 0 | 0 | 8 | 0.000 | 85 | 168 | 0.506 | |

Source: "โปรแกรมแข่งขันตะกร้อ ชิงถ้วยพระราชทาน "คิงส์คัพ"ครั้งที่ 35 ระหว่างวันที่ 24-31 ก.ค.2565 ที่ศูนย์การค้าแฟชั่นไอส์แลนด์ กรุงเทพฯ". เซปัก ตะกร้อ - Sepak Takraw (in Thai). 24 July 2022.

| 26 July; 9:45 | Laos | 2-0 | Malaysia | Fashion Island, Bangkok |
| 26 July; 9:45 | (21-17, 21-12); R2 Report | | | Fashion Island, Bangkok |

| 26 July; 9:45 | Chinese Taipei | 2-0 | Nepal | Fashion Island, Bangkok |
| 26 July; 9:45 | (21-12, 21-13); R2 Report | | | Fashion Island, Bangkok |

| 26 July; 15:00 | Malaysia | 2-0 | Chinese Taipei | Fashion Island, Bangkok |
| 26 July; 15:00 | (21-9, 21-13); R2 Report | | | Fashion Island, Bangkok |

| 26 July; 15:00 | Nepal | 0-2 | Iran | Fashion Island, Bangkok |
| 26 July; 15:00 | (14-21, 15-21); R2 Report | | | Fashion Island, Bangkok |

| 27 July; 9:00 | Laos | 2-0 | Nepal | Fashion Island, Bangkok |
| 27 July; 9:00 | (21-6, 21-6); R2 Report | | | Fashion Island, Bangkok |

| 27 July; 9:00 | Chinese Taipei | 2-1 | Iran | Fashion Island, Bangkok |
| 27 July; 9:00 | (21-11, 15-21, 21-15); R2 Report | | | Fashion Island, Bangkok |

| 28 July; 9:00 | Laos | 2-0 | Iran | Fashion Island, Bangkok |
| 28 July; 9:00 | (21-6, 21-8); R2 Report | | | Fashion Island, Bangkok |

| 28 July; 9:00 | Malaysia | 2-0 | Nepal | Fashion Island, Bangkok |
| 28 July; 9:00 | (21-10, 21-11); R2 Report | | | Fashion Island, Bangkok |

| 28 July; 13:45 | Laos | 2-0 | Chinese Taipei | Fashion Island, Bangkok |
| 28 July; 13:45 | 21-0, 21-0; R2 Report | | | Fashion Island, Bangkok |

| 28 July; 13:45 | Malaysia | 2-0 | Iran | Fashion Island, Bangkok |
| 28 July; 13:45 | 21-8, 21-9; R2 Report | | | Fashion Island, Bangkok |

==== WD-PM Final ====
Semifinal
1A | Indonesia | 21 | 21 | 2
2B | Malaysia | 14 | 11 | 0
Date: 29 July, 16:45 Report
1B | Laos | 22 | 21 | 2
2A | Myanmar | 20 | 13 | 0

Final
Indonesia | 0
Laos | 2

Winner
Women's Double Premier Division
2022 King's Cup Sepaktakraw World Championship
(Laos)
Laos
First title

== Mixed Quad (Mx.Q) ==
=== Mx.Q Group stage ===
Group A

| Pos | Team | Pld | W | L | Pts | SW | SL | SR | SPW | SPL | SPR | Qualification |
|---|---|---|---|---|---|---|---|---|---|---|---|---|
| 1 | Thailand | 3 | 3 | 0 | 9 | 6 | 0 | MAX | 126 | 61 | 2.066 | Advance to final round |
| 2 | Myanmar | 3 | 2 | 1 | 6 | 4 | 2 | 2.000 | 118 | 91 | 1.297 | Advance to final round |
| 3 | Chinese Taipei | 3 | 1 | 2 | 3 | 2 | 4 | 0.500 | 89 | 106 | 0.840 | |
| 4 | Sri Lanka | 3 | 0 | 3 | 0 | 0 | 6 | 0.000 | 51 | 126 | 0.405 | |

Source: "โปรแกรมแข่งขันตะกร้อ ชิงถ้วยพระราชทาน "คิงส์คัพ"ครั้งที่ 35 ระหว่างวันที่ 24-31 ก.ค.2565 ที่ศูนย์การค้าแฟชั่นไอส์แลนด์ กรุงเทพฯ". เซปัก ตะกร้อ - Sepak Takraw (in Thai). 24 July 2022.

| 26 July; 11:15 | Thailand | 2-0 | Myanmar | Fashion Island, Bangkok |
| 26 July; 11:15 | (21-18, 21-15); R2 Report | | | Fashion Island, Bangkok |

| 26 July; 11:15 | Chinese Taipei | 2-0 | Sri Lanka | Fashion Island, Bangkok |
| 26 July; 11:15 | (21-8, 21-12); R2 Report | | | Fashion Island, Bangkok |

| 26 July; 16:30 | Thailand | 2-0 | Chinese Taipei | Fashion Island, Bangkok |
| 26 July; 16:30 | (21-7, 21-7); R2 Report | | | Fashion Island, Bangkok |

| 26 July; 16:30 | Myanmar | 2-0 | Sri Lanka | Fashion Island, Bangkok |
| 26 July; 16:30 | (21-9, 21-7); R2 Report | | | Fashion Island, Bangkok |

| 27 July; 11:15 | Thailand | 2-0 | Sri Lanka | Fashion Island, Bangkok |
| 27 July; 11:15 | (21-3, 21-11); R2 Report | | | Fashion Island, Bangkok |

| 27 July; 11:15 | Myanmar | 2-0 | Chinese Taipei | Fashion Island, Bangkok |
| 27 July; 11:15 | (22-20, 21-13); R2 Report | | | Fashion Island, Bangkok |

Group B

| Pos | Team | Pld | W | L | Pts | SW | SL | SR | SPW | SPL | SPR | Qualification |
|---|---|---|---|---|---|---|---|---|---|---|---|---|
| 1 | Indonesia | 4 | 4 | 0 | 12 | 8 | 0 | MAX | 180 | 100 | 1.800 | Advance to final round |
| 2 | India | 4 | 3 | 1 | 9 | 6 | 2 | 3.000 | 170 | 95 | 1.789 | Advance to final round |
| 3 | Vietnam | 4 | 2 | 2 | 6 | 4 | 2 | 2.000 | 136 | 100 | 1.360 | |
| 4 | Iraq | 4 | 1 | 3 | 3 | 2 | 6 | 0.333 | 39 | 143 | 0.273 | |
| 5 | Pakistan | 4 | 0 | 4 | 0 | 0 | 8 | 0.000 | 65 | 168 | 0.387 | |

Source: "โปรแกรมแข่งขันตะกร้อ ชิงถ้วยพระราชทาน "คิงส์คัพ"ครั้งที่ 35 ระหว่างวันที่ 24-31 ก.ค.2565 ที่ศูนย์การค้าแฟชั่นไอส์แลนด์ กรุงเทพฯ". เซปัก ตะกร้อ - Sepak Takraw (in Thai). 24 July 2022.

| 26 July; 12:00 | Vietnam | 0-2 | Indonesia | Fashion Island, Bangkok |
| 26 July; 12:00 | (12-21, 14-21); R2 Report | | | Fashion Island, Bangkok |

| 26 July; 12:00 | India | 2-0 | Pakistan | Fashion Island, Bangkok |
| 26 July; 12:00 | (21-12, 21-9); R2 Report | | | Fashion Island, Bangkok |

| 26 July; 16:30 | Indonesia | 2-0 | India | Fashion Island, Bangkok |
| 26 July; 16:30 | (26-24, 22-20); R2 Report | | | Fashion Island, Bangkok |

| 26 July; 16:30 | Pakistan | 0-2 | Iraq | Fashion Island, Bangkok |
| 26 July; 16:30 | (7-21, 10-21); R2 Report | | | Fashion Island, Bangkok |

| 27 July; 10:30 | Vietnam | 2-0 | Pakistan | Fashion Island, Bangkok |
| 27 July; 10:30 | (21-12, 21-4); R2 Report | | | Fashion Island, Bangkok |

| 27 July; 10:30 | India | 2-0 | Iraq | Fashion Island, Bangkok |
| 27 July; 10:30 | (21-0, 21-0); R2 Report | | | Fashion Island, Bangkok |

| 27 July; 14:00 | Vietnam | 2-0 | Iraq | Fashion Island, Bangkok |
| 27 July; 14:00 | (21-0, 21-0); R2 Report | | | Fashion Island, Bangkok |

| 27 July; 14:00 | Indonesia | 2-0 | Pakistan | Fashion Island, Bangkok |
| 27 July; 14:00 | (21-5, 21-6); R2 Report | | | Fashion Island, Bangkok |

| 28 July; 9:00 | Vietnam | 0-2 | India | Fashion Island, Bangkok |
| 28 July; 9:00 | (14-21, 12-21); R2 Report | | | Fashion Island, Bangkok |

| 28 July; 9:00 | Indonesia | 2-0 | Iraq | Fashion Island, Bangkok |
| 28 July; 9:00 | (21-8, 21-10); R2 Report | | | Fashion Island, Bangkok |

=== Mx.Q Final round ===
Semifinal
1A | Thailand | 22 | 21 | 21 | 2
2B | India | 24 | 9 | 15 | 1
Date: 29 July, 16:00 Report
1B | Indonesia | 21 | 21 | - | 2
2A | Myanmar | 10 | 10 | - | 0

Final
Thailand | 21 | 21 | - | 2
Indonesia | 12 | 17 | - | 0

Winner
Mixed Quad Premier Division
2022 King's Cup Sepaktakraw World Championship
(Thailand)
Thailand
First title

== Hoop ==
=== Ranking round ===
The ranking round of Hoop events was conducted on the first day of the tournament. The four highest-scoring teams in each category (Men and Women) progressed to the final round. The scoring result was listed below.

Men's hoop (MH)

- Brazil: 0
- Brunei: 0
- Cambodia: 420 (QF2)
- Laos: 310 (QF3)
- Pakistan: 20 (QF4)
- Thailand: 620 (QF1)

Women's hoop (WH)

- Cambodia: 260 (QF3)
- India: 180 (QF4)
- Laos: 380 (QF2)
- Thailand: 600 (QF1)

=== Final round ===
Men's hoop

Semifinals
24 July – 17:50
1 | Thailand | 580
4 | Pakistan | 10
24 July – 18:30
2 | Cambodia | 460
3 | Laos | 350

Final
25 July – 09:40
Thailand | 680
Cambodia | 410

Winner
Men's Hoop
2022 King's Cup Sepaktakraw World Championship
(Thailand)
Thailand
Sixteenth title

Women's hoop

Semifinals
24 July – 16:30
1 | Thailand | 610
4 | India | 170
24 July – 17:10
2 | Laos | 390
3 | Cambodia | 230

Final
25 July – 09:00
Thailand | 690
Laos | 450

Winner
Women's Hoop
2022 King's Cup Sepaktakraw World Championship
(Thailand)
Thailand
Sixteenth title
