= Philippines at the 2023 SEA Games =

Philippines at the 2023 Southeast Asian Games
- IOC code: PHI
- NOC: Philippine Olympic Committee
- Website: www.olympic.ph

in Phnom Penh, Cambodia 5 – 16 May 2023
- Competitors: 840 in 38 sports
- Flag bearers: Alyssa Valdez (Volleyball)
- Officials: 257
- Medals Ranked 5th: Gold 58 Silver 85 Bronze 117 Total 260

Southeast Asian Games appearances (overview)
- 1977; 1979; 1981; 1983; 1985; 1987; 1989; 1991; 1993; 1995; 1997; 1999; 2001; 2003; 2005; 2007; 2009; 2011; 2013; 2015; 2017; 2019; 2021; 2023; 2025; 2027; 2029

The Philippines participated at the 32nd Southeast Asian Games which was held from 5 to 16 May 2023 in Phnom Penh, Cambodia.

The Philippine delegation finished in 5th place with a final count of 58 gold, 85 silver and 117 bronze medals.

== Preparation ==
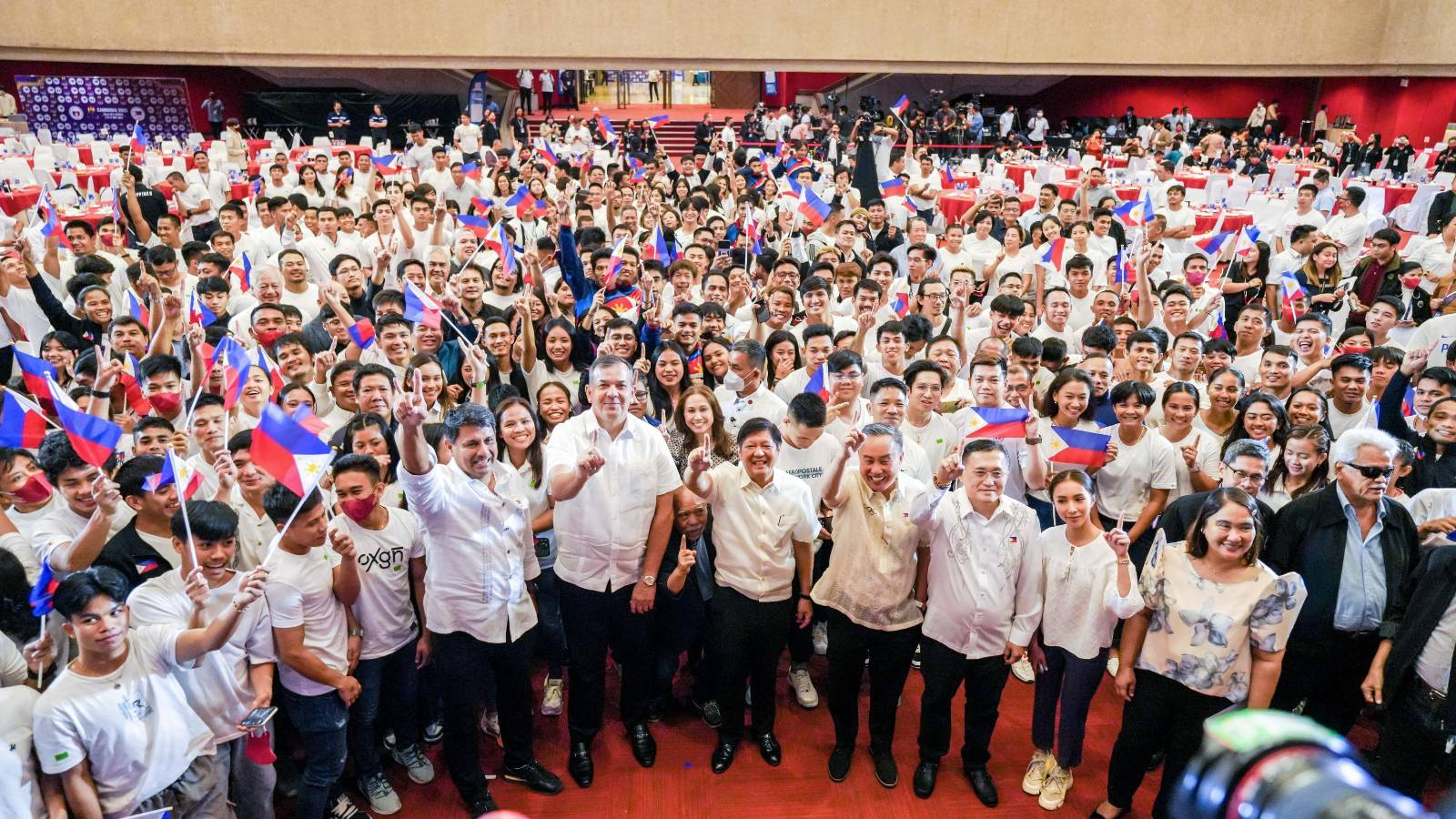
President Bongbong Marcos and other officials with the Philippines' 840-strong 2023 SEA Games delegation

The Philippine delegation to the 2023 Southeast Asian Games composed of 814 athletes in all sports, with Chito Loyzaga as the chef de mission.

The Philippines participated in all 38 sports with 905 athletes. For non-traditional sports, they employed athletes who played a similar discipline such as traditional swimmers for fin swimming and kickboxers for kun bokator. The national delegation also had to contend with the 70 percent participation limit in combat sports or martial arts; a quota not applicable to the hosts.

An all-women delegation, save for Philippine Olympic Committee President Abraham Tolentino and chef de mission Loyzaga, represented the country in the opening ceremony. Volleyball player Alyssa Valdez was the flag-bearer in the opening ceremony.

== Medalists ==
=== Gold ===
No.	Medal	Name	Sport	Event	Date
1	Gold	Kaila Napolis	Jujitsu	Women's ne-waza gi -52 kg	4 May
2	Gold	Angel Gwen Derla	Kun bokator	Women's single bamboo shield form	4 May
3	Gold	Precious Cabuya	Obstacle race	Women's individual	6 May
4	Gold	Mark Julius Rodelas	Obstacle race	Men's individual	6 May
5	Gold	Sakura Alforte	Karate	Women's individual kata	6 May
6	Gold	Annie Ramirez	Jujitsu	Women's ne-waza nogi -52 kg	6 May
7	Gold	Erika Burgos; Kira Ellis; Matthew Hermosa; Inaki Lorbes	Endurance race	Mixed aquathlon 4x team relay	6 May
8	Gold	Sandi Menchi Abahan; Mecca Cortizano; Tess Nocyao; Mhik Tejares	Obstacle race	Women's team relay	7 May
9	Gold	Jay-R de Castro; Mervin Guarte; Ahgie Radan; Elias Tabac	Obstacle race	Men's team relay	7 May
10	Gold	Kim Mangrobang	Endurance race	Women's individual duathlon	7 May
11	Gold	Jamie Lim	Karate	Women's -55 kg kumite	7 May
12	Gold	Princess Catindig; Bien Zoleta-Mañalac	Soft tennis	Women's individual doubles	7 May
13	Gold	Marc Alexander Lim	Jujitsu	Men's ne-waza nogi -69 kg	7 May
14	Gold	Reniel "Dr4w" Angara; Aaron Mark "Aaron" Bingay; Golden Hart "DemonKite" Dajao; Gerald Gianne "Tgee" Gelacio; Chammy Paul "Chammy" Nazarrea; Justine Ritchie "Juschie" Tan	E-sports	League of Legends: Wild Rift – mixed team	7 May
15	Gold	Fernando Casares	Endurance race	Men's individual triathlon	8 May
16	Gold	Carlos Yulo	Gymnastics	Men's artistic all-around	8 May
17	Gold	Robin Catalan	Kun bokator	Men's combat 50 kg	8 May
18	Gold	Xiandi Chua	Swimming	Women's 200m backstroke	8 May
19	Gold	Ernest John Obiena	Athletics	Men's pole vault	8 May
20	Gold	John Ivan Cruz	Gymnastics	Men's artistic floor exercise	9 May
21	Gold	Miguel Besana	Gymnastics	Men's artistic vault	9 May
22	Gold	Carlos Yulo	Gymnastics	Men's artistic parallel bars	9 May
23	Gold	Fatima Amirul; Virvien Bejosano; Princess Catindig; Bien Zoleta-Mañalac; Christy Sañosa; Bambi Zoleta	Soft tennis	Women's team	9 May
24	Gold	Janry Ubas	Athletics	Men's long jump	9 May
25	Gold	Teia Salvino	Swimming	Women's 100m backstroke	9 May
26	Gold	Joseph Arcilla	Soft tennis	Men's individual singles	10 May
27	Gold	Eric Cray	Athletics	Men's 400m hurdles	11 May
28	Gold	Agatha Wong	Wushu	Women's taijiquan + taijijian	12 May
29	Gold	Nicole Labayne; Aidaine Laxa; Jocel Lyn Ninobla	Taekwondo	Women's recognized team poomsae	12 May
30	Gold	Patrick King Perez	Taekwondo	Men's recognized individual poomsae	12 May
31	Gold	Michael del Prado; Frederick Ramirez; Joyme Sequita; Umajesty Williams	Athletics	Men's 4 × 400m relay	12 May
32	Gold	Ian Clark Bautista	Boxing	Men's 57 kg	13 May
33	Gold	Kurt Barbosa	Taekwondo	Men's -54 kg kyorugi	13 May
34	Gold	Arven Alcantara	Taekwondo	Men's -68 kg kyorugi	13 May
35	Gold	Samuel Morrison	Taekwondo	Men's -87 kg kyorugi	13 May
36	Gold	Francis Alcantara; Ruben Gonzales	Tennis	Men's doubles	13 May
37	Gold	Kirstie Alora	Taekwondo	Women's -73 kg kyorugi	13 May
38	Gold	Elreen Ando	Weightlifting	Women's 59 kg	14 May
39	Gold	Rena Furukawa	Judo	Women's 57 kg	14 May
40	Gold	Carlo Paalam	Boxing	Men's 54 kg	14 May
41	Gold	Paul Bascon	Boxing	Men's 60 kg	14 May
42	Gold	Angelo Kyle "Pheww" Arcangel; David "FlapTzy" Canon; Nowee "Ryota" Macasa; Marco "Super Marco" Requitano; Kyle "KyleTzy" Sayson; Rowgien "Owgwen" Unigo	E-sports	Mobile Legends: Bang Bang – men's team	14 May
43	Gold	Jason Balabal	Wrestling	Men's greco roman 82 kg	14 May
44	Gold	Charlotte Tolentino	Arnis	Women's full contact passed stick bantamweight	14 May
45	Gold	Jedah Soriano	Arnis	Women's full contact passed stick lightweight	14 May
46	Gold	Nesthy Petecio	Boxing	Women's 57 kg	14 May
47	Gold	Vanessa Sarno	Weightlifting	Women's 71 kg	15 May
48	Gold	Cristina Vergara	Wrestling	Women's freestyle 65 kg	15 May
49	Gold	Ella Alcoseba	Arnis	Women's full contact live stick bantamweight	15 May
50	Gold	Dexler Bolambao	Arnis	Men's full contact live stick bantamweight	15 May
51	Gold	Jean Claude Saclag	Kickboxing	Men's low kick -63.5 kg	15 May
52	Gold	Alvin Lobreguito	Wrestling	Men's freestyle 57 kg	16 May
53	Gold	Trixie Lofranco	Arnis	Women's individual anyo non-traditional open weapon	16 May
54	Gold	Crisamuel Delfin	Arnis	Men's individual anyo non-traditional open weapon	16 May
55	Gold	Ronil Tubog	Wrestling	Men's freestyle 55 kg	16 May
56	Gold	Mason Amos; Justin Brownlee; Marcio Lassiter; Jerom Lastimosa; Chris Newsome; Calvin Oftana; CJ Perez; Michael Phillips; Chris Ross; Brandon Ganuelas-Rosser; Christian Standhardinger; Arvin Tolentino	Basketball	Men's 5x5	16 May
57	Gold	Gretel de Paz	Kickboxing	Women's low kick -57 kg	16 May
58	Gold	Claudine Veloso	Kickboxing	Women's k1 -52 kg	16 May

=== Silver ===
No.	Medal	Name	Sport	Event	Date
1	Silver	Mark James Lacao	Kun bokator	Men's single bamboo shield form	4 May
2	Silver	Rhichein Yosorez	Kun bokator	Women's single bare hands form	4 May
3	Silver	Kaizen Dela Serna	Obstacle race	Women's individual	6 May
4	Silver	Kevin Pascua	Obstacle race	Men's individual	6 May
5	Silver	Kim Remolino	Endurance race	Men's individual aquathlon	6 May
6	Silver	Arlan Arbois	Athletics	Men's marathon	6 May
7	Silver	Junna Tsukii	Karate	Women's -50 kg kumite	6 May
8	Silver	Jasmine Alkhaldi; Xiandi Chua; Miranda Renner; Teia Salvino	Swimming	Women's 4 × 100 m freestyle relay	6 May
9	Silver	Janelle Mae Frayna; Shania Mae Mendoza	Ouk chaktrang	Women's doubles 60 minute	6 May
10	Silver	Jack Animam; Afril Bernardino; Mikka Cacho; Janine Pontejos	Basketball	Women's 3x3	7 May
11	Silver	Joseph Eriobu; Lervin Flores; Joseph Sedurifa; Almond Vosotros	Basketball	Men's 3x3	7 May
12	Silver	Matthew Manantan	Karate	Men's -67 kg kumite	7 May
13	Silver	Arianne Brito	Karate	Women's +68 kg kumite	7 May
14	Silver	Ivan Agustin	Karate	Men's -84 kg kumite	7 May
15	Silver	Remon Misu	Karate	Women's -68 kg kumite	7 May
16	Silver	Meggie Ochoa	Jujitsu	Women's ne-waza nogi -52 kg	7 May
17	Silver	Emmanuel Cantores	Vovinam	Men's 60 kg	7 May
18	Silver	Alfau Jan Abad; Almuhadib Abad	Pencak silat	Men's artistic seni ganda (doubles)	7 May
19	Silver	Jerard Jacinto	Swimming	Men's 50m backstroke	7 May
20	Silver	Kim Mangrobang	Endurance race	Women's individual triathlon	8 May
21	Silver	Ariana Evangelista	Cycling	Women's mountain bike eliminator	8 May
22	Silver	Arianne Brito; Jamie Lim; Remon Misu; Junna Tsukii	Karate	Women's team kumite	8 May
23	Silver	Hergie Bacyadan	Vovinam	Women's 65 kg	8 May
24	Silver	Chloe Isleta	Swimming	Women's 200m backstroke	8 May
25	Silver	Jasmine Alkhaldi	Swimming	Women's 100m freestyle	8 May
26	Silver	Andrei Tugade	Sailing	Men's windfoil IQ: foil youth	8 May
27	Silver	Mariane Mariano	Kun bokator	Women's combat 55 kg	8 May
28	Silver	Kylie Mallari	Kun bokator	Women's combat 60 kg	8 May
29	Silver	Ariel Lampacan	Kun bokator	Men's combat 55 kg	8 May
30	Silver	Geli Bulaong	Kun bokator	Men's combat 60 kg	8 May
31	Silver	Miguel Besana; John Ivan Cruz; Justine Ace De Leon; Jhon Santillan; Jan Gwynn Timbang; Carlos Yulo	Gymnastics	Men's artistic team	8 May
32	Silver	Shania Mae Mendoza	Ouk chaktrang	Women's singles 60 minute	9 May
33	Silver	Carlos Yulo	Gymnastics	Men's artistic still rings	9 May
34	Silver	Umajesty Williams	Athletics	Men's 400m	9 May
35	Silver	Sonny Wagdos	Athletics	Men's 1500m	9 May
36	Silver	Joida Gagnao	Athletics	Women's 3000m stepplechase	9 May
37	Silver	Jasmine Alkhaldi; Thanya dela Cruz; Jarod Hatch; Jerard Jacinto	Swimming	Mixed 4 × 100 m medley relay	9 May
38	Silver	Jennifer Alumbro; JK Andreano; Josie Arimas; Catherine Bagaoisan; Joan Diosino; Jonna Eguid; Joelle Galapin; Johannah Hulipas; Christine Joy Lovino; Lolita Olaguier; Romera Osabel; Riza Penalba; April Saquilon; Alex Smith; Simranjeet Smith	Cricket	Women's 6 a side	10 May
39	Silver	Janry Ubas	Athletics	Men's decathlon	10 May
40	Silver	Dines Dumaan	Pencak silat	Men's tanding Class A (45–50kg)	10 May
41	Silver	Bambi Zoleta	Soft tennis	Women's individual singles	10 May
42	Silver	John John Bobier; Joshua Bullo; Ronsited Gabayeron; Jason Huerte; Rheyjey Ortouste; Vince Torno	Sepak takraw	Men's hoop	10 May
43	Silver	Deseree Autor; Allyssa Bandoy; Kristine Lapsit; Mary Ann Lopez; Abegail Sinogbuhan; Jean Sucalit	Sepak takraw	Women's hoop	10 May
44	Silver	Robyn Brown	Athletics	Women's 400m hurdles	11 May
45	Silver	Noelito Jose	Fencing	Men's épée	11 May
46	Silver	Kristian Narca	Kun Khmer	Men's -57kg	11 May
47	Silver	Jasmine Alkhaldi; Thanya dela Cruz; Miranda Renner; Teia Salvino	Swimming	Women's 4 × 100 m medley relay	11 May
48	Silver	Ronne Malipay	Athletics	Men's triple jump	11 May
49	Silver	Sarah Dequinan	Athletics	Women's heptathlon	11 May
50	Silver	Kaye Maerylle "Keishi" Alpuerto; Rica Fatima "Amoree" Amores; Alexandria Dhzoie "Lexaa" Dardo; Gwyneth "Ayanami" Diagon; Sheen "Shinoa" Perez; Mery Christine "Meraay" Vivero	E-sports	Mobile Legends: Bang Bang – women's team	11 May
51	Silver	Samantha Catantan	Fencing	Women's foil	12 May
52	Silver	Gideon Padua	Wushu	Men's sanda 60 kg	12 May
53	Silver	Ian Matthew Corton; Patrick King Perez; Joaquin Tuzon	Taekwondo	Men's recognized team poomsae	12 May
54	Silver	Gennah Malapit	Athletics	Women's javelin throw	12 May
55	Silver	Bernalyn Bejoy; Robyn Brown; Jessel Lumapas; Maureen Schrijvers	Athletics	Women's 4 × 400 m relay	12 May
56	Silver	Angeline Colonia	Weightlifting	Women's 45 kg	13 May
57	Silver	Lovely Inan	Weightlifting	Women's 49 kg	13 May
58	Silver	Rogen Ladon	Boxing	Men's 51 kg	13 May
59	Silver	Irish Magno	Boxing	Women's 54 kg	13 May
60	Silver	Riza Pasuit	Boxing	Women's 63 kg	13 May
61	Silver	Samuel Tranquillan	Fencing	Men's foil	13 May
62	Silver	John Febuar Ceniza	Weightlifting	Men's 61 kg	13 May
63	Silver	Alexi Kouzenye Cabayaran	Finswimming	Women's 200m bi fins	13 May
64	Silver	Rosalinda Faustino	Weightlifting	Women's 55 kg	14 May
65	Silver	Nicole Cortey; Queen Dalmacio; Jylyn Nicanor; Andrea Sayson	Fencing	Women's sabre team	14 May
66	Silver	Norlan Petecio	Boxing	Men's 67 kg	14 May
67	Silver	Shugen Nakano	Judo	Men's -66 kg	14 May
68	Silver	John Marvin	Boxing	Men's 80 kg	14 May
69	Silver	Michael Cater	Wrestling	Men's greco roman 55 kg	14 May
70	Silver	Noel Norada	Wrestling	Men's greco roman 62 kg	14 May
71	Silver	Jason Baucas	Wrestling	Men's greco roman 72 kg	14 May
72	Silver	Jack Animam; Stefanie Berberabe; Afril Bernardino; Chack Cabinbin; Khate Castillo; Clare Castro; Camille Clarin; Ella Fajardo; Trina Guytingco; Janine Pontejos; Angelica Surada; Marizze Tongco	Basketball	Women's 5x5	15 May
73	Silver	Jiah Pingot	Wrestling	Women's freestyle 50 kg	15 May
74	Silver	Jeanmae Lobo	Wrestling	Women's freestyle 72 kg	15 May
75	Silver	Renalyn Daquel	Kickboxing	Women's full contact -48 kg	15 May
76	Silver	Fitzchel Fermato	Kickboxing	Women's light contact -50 kg	15 May
77	Silver	Jude Rodriguez	Arnis	Women's full contact live stick lightweight	15 May
78	Silver	Jennifer Alumbro; JK Andreano; Josie Arimas; Catherine Bagaoisan; Joan Diosino; Jonna Eguid; Joelle Galapin; Johannah Hulipas; Christine Joy Lovino; Lolita Olaguier; Romera Osabel; Riza Penalba; April Saquilon; Alex Smith; Simranjeet Smith	Cricket	Women's T10	16 May
79	Silver	Gina Iniong-Araos	Kickboxing	Women's kick light -55 kg	16 May
80	Silver	Hanniel Abella; Ivy Dinoy; Alexa Larrazabal; Andrea Matias	Fencing	Women's team épée	16 May
81	Silver	Jefferson Manatad	Wrestling	Men's freestyle 92 kg	16 May
82	Silver	Chino Sy Tancontian	Wrestling	Men's freestyle 97 kg	16 May
83	Silver	Mary All-In Aldeguer; Jeanette Agapito; Crystal Jane Sapio	Arnis	Women's team anyo non-traditional open weapon	16 May
84	Silver	Bryant Arocena; Christofer Bernardo; Fredrik Cantos; Christian Castrillo; Patrik Castrillo; Mattiece Cortez; John Embile; Fredrik Escabel; Simon Sicat Laraño; Luis Manila; Melvin Alm Mendoza; Henielee Pastor; Michael Peña; Lucas Perez; Ludvig Porral; Victor Regalado; Kim Rosello Varga; Claude Vitaliano; Lucas Werelius	Floorball	Men's tournament	16 May
85	Silver	Jeremy Pacatiw	Kickboxing	Men's k1 -67 kg	16 May

=== Bronze ===
No.	Medal	Name	Sport	Event	Date
1	Bronze	Jan Harvey Navarro; Karl Dale Navarro	Jujitsu	Men's duo	4 May
2	Bronze	Dianne Bargo; Isabela Montaña	Jujitsu	Women's show	4 May
3	Bronze	Kylie Mallari	Kun bokator	Women's single bokator spirit form	4 May
4	Bronze	Christine Hallasgo	Athletics	Women's marathon	6 May
5	Bronze	Joco Vasquez	Karate	Men's individual kata	6 May
6	Bronze	Myron Myles Mangubat	Jujitsu	Men's ne-waza gi -62 kg	6 May
7	Bronze	AC Divina; Luan Gutierrez	Jujitsu	Women's duo	6 May
8	Bronze	Rhenel Desuyo	Vovinam	Men's 65 kg	6 May
9	Bronze	Jerlyn Kingad	Vovinam	Women's 55 kg	6 May
10	Bronze	Jovan Medallo	Vovinam	Men's sun-moon broadsword form	6 May
11	Bronze	Jerard Jacinto	Swimming	Men's 100m backstroke	6 May
12	Bronze	Joey Antonio; Paulo Bersamina; Jan Emmanuel Garcia; Darwin Laylo	Ouk chaktrang	Men's quadruples 60 minute	6 May
13	Bronze	Jayson Cayari; Raymond Villaraza	Jujitsu	Men's show	6 May
14	Bronze	Ariana Evangelista; EJ Flores; Jerico Nano Rivera; Shagne Yaoyao	Cycling	Mixed mountain bike cross-country relay	7 May
15	Bronze	Jessa dela Cruz; Franchette Anne Elman; Shara Julia Jizmundo	Pencak silat	Women's artistic regu (team)	7 May
16	Bronze	Chris Gallego; Estie Gay Liwanen	Jujitsu	Mixed duo classic	7 May
17	Bronze	Ian Patrick Gurrobat; Lesly Romero	Jujitsu	Mixed duo show	7 May
18	Bronze	Rhichein Yosorez	Kun bokator	Women's -45 kg	7 May
19	Bronze	Phillip Delarmino	Kun bokator	Men's -60 kg	7 May
20	Bronze	Ryan Jakiri	Kun bokator	Men's -65 kg	7 May
21	Bronze	Godwin Langbayan	Kun bokator	Men's -70 kg	7 May
22	Bronze	Jenelyn Olsim	Kun Khmer	Women's -54kg	7 May
23	Bronze	Floryvic Montero	Kun Khmer	Women's -48kg	7 May
24	Bronze	Teia Salvino	Swimming	Women's 50m backstroke	7 May
25	Bronze	Jan Cortez	Jujitsu	Men's ne-waza nogi -56 kg	7 May
26	Bronze	Kim Remolino	Endurance race	Men's individual triathlon	8 May
27	Bronze	Zandro Jizmundo; James El Mayagma; Rick Ortega	Kun bokator	Men's bare hands form (team/trio)	8 May
28	Bronze	Mitz Jalandoni	Kun bokator	Women's single phkak form	8 May
29	Bronze	Jessa dela Cruz; Angel Gwen Derla; Shara Julia Jizmundo	Kun bokator	Women's bare hands form (team/trio)	8 May
30	Bronze	Jerome Alidon	Vovinam	Men's 55 kg	8 May
31	Bronze	John Harold Madrigal	Sailing	Men's windfoil IQ: foil	8 May
32	Bronze	Denver John Castillo	Sailing	Men's windsurfing RS: one	8 May
33	Bronze	Robyn Brown; Jessel Lumapas; Frederick Ramirez; Umajesty Williams	Athletics	Mixed 4 × 400 m relay	8 May
34	Bronze	Venice Vicente Narciso	Ouk chaktrang	Women's singles 60 minute	9 May
35	Bronze	Aime Ramos	Vovinam	Women's 50 kg	9 May
36	Bronze	Janah Lavador	Vovinam	Women's aspect broadsword single form	9 May
37	Bronze	Felex Cantores	Kun Khmer	Men's -67kg	9 May
38	Bronze	Zyra Bon-as	Kun Khmer	Women's -51kg	9 May
39	Bronze	April Joy Alarcon; Maria Corazon Soberre	Pétanque	Women's doubles	9 May
40	Bronze	John Kenneth Alde; Christian Amores; Matthew Arnaez; Aldrin Paul Borabon; Justine Reige Perez; Arthur Gabrielle Tecson	E-sports	Cross Fire – mixed team	9 May
41	Bronze	Paulo Bersamina; Jan Emmanuel Garcia	Ouk chaktrang	Men's double 60 minute	9 May
42	Bronze	Mark Anthony Alcoseba; Joseph Arcilla; Patrick Mendoza; Thor Moralde; Sherwin Nuguit; Dheo Talatayod	Soft tennis	Men's team	9 May
43	Bronze	Frederick Ramirez	Athletics	Men's 400m	9 May
44	Bronze	Jasmine Alkhaldi	Swimming	Women's 100m butterfly	9 May
45	Bronze	Xiandi Chua	Swimming	Women's 400m individual medley	9 May
46	Bronze	Jarod Hatch	Swimming	Men's 100m butterfly	9 May
47	Bronze	Aries Toledo	Athletics	Men's decathlon	9 May
48	Bronze	Gregmart Benitez	Pencak silat	Men's tanding Class C (55–60kg)	10 May
49	Bronze	Denmark Abdurasad	Pencak silat	Men's tanding Class D (60–65kg)	10 May
50	Bronze	Ian Christopher Calo	Pencak silat	Men's tanding Class E (60–65kg)	10 May
51	Bronze	Joash Cantoria	Pencak silat	Men's tanding Class H (80–85kg)	10 May
52	Bronze	Angeline Virina	Pencak silat	Women's tanding Class A (45–50kg)	10 May
53	Bronze	Rogielyn Parado	Pencak silat	Women's tanding Class C (55–60kg)	10 May
54	Bronze	Angel-Ann Singh	Pencak silat	Women's tanding Class D (60–65kg)	10 May
55	Bronze	Moises Ilogon	Kun Khmer	Men's -60kg	10 May
56	Bronze	John Cristopher Tolentino	Athletics	Men's 110m hurdles	10 May
57	Bronze	Jarod Hatch	Swimming	Men's 50m butterfly	10 May
58	Bronze	Nathaniel "Nexi" Cabero; Jed "Draxiimov" Jamir; Xavier "xavi8k" Juan; George "Georggyyy" Lachica; Brheyanne "Wild0reoo" Reyes; Mark "Markyyy" Tuling	E-sports	Valorant – mixed team	10 May
59	Bronze	Jasmine Alkhaldi; Xiandi Chua; Chloe Isleta; Teia Salvino	Swimming	Women's 4 × 200 m freestyle relay	10 May
60	Bronze	Nicole Albo; Bianca Carlos-Dalisay; Mika de Guzman; Christel Rei Fuentespina; Lea Inlayo; Alyssa Leonardo; Thea Pomar; Susmita Ramos	Badminton	Women's team	10 May
61	Bronze	Natalie Uy	Athletics	Women's pole vault	10 May
62	Bronze	Ronald Oranza	Cycling	Men's road criterium	11 May
63	Bronze	Sandrex Gainsan	Wushu	Men's jianshu + qiangshu	11 May
64	Bronze	Russel Diaz	Wushu	Men's sanda 52 kg	11 May
65	Bronze	Carlos Baylon	Wushu	Men's sanda 56 kg	11 May
66	Bronze	Jenifer Kilapio	Wushu	Women's sanda 48 kg	11 May
67	Bronze	Jylyn Nicanor	Fencing	Women's sabre	11 May
68	Bronze	Francisco dela Cruz	Billiards	Men's 3-cushion carom singles	11 May
69	Bronze	Markus Tongco	Boxing	Men's 92 kg	11 May
70	Bronze	Jasmine Alkhaldi	Swimming	Women's 50m butterfly	11 May
71	Bronze	Mark Harry Diones	Athletics	Men's triple jump	11 May
72	Bronze	Ronald Oranza	Cycling	Men's road individual - mass start	12 May
73	Bronze	Evalyn Palabrica	Athletics	Women's javelin throw	12 May
74	Bronze	Ian Matthew Corton; Jocel Lyn Ninobla	Taekwondo	Mixed recognized pair poomsae	12 May
75	Bronze	Juvenile Crisostomo; Jeordan Dominguez; Kobe Macario; Zyka Santiago; Darius Venerable	Taekwondo	Mixed freestyle team poomsae	12 May
76	Bronze	Charmaine Dolar	Gymnastics	Women's aerobic individual	13 May
77	Bronze	Ivy Dinoy	Fencing	Women's épée	13 May
78	Bronze	Carlo Biado; Johann Chua	Billiards	Men's 9-ball pool doubles	13 May
79	Bronze	Veronica Garces	Taekwondo	Women's -45 kg kyorugi	13 May
80	Bronze	Nicole Ann McCann	Taekwondo	Women's -57 kg kyorugi	13 May
81	Bronze	Richard Gonzales; John Russel Misal	Table tennis	Men's doubles	14 May
82	Bronze	Charmaine Dolar; Carl Joshua Tangonan	Gymnastics	Mixed aerobic pair	14 May
83	Bronze	Miguel Bautista; Rex dela Cruz; Lee Ergina; Noelito Jose	Fencing	Men's team épée	14 May
84	Bronze	Daryl Mercado	Judo	Men's -55 kg	14 May
85	Bronze	Chlovelle Van Adolfo	Wrestling	Men's greco roman 67 kg	14 May
86	Bronze	Noah Gonzales	Arnis	Men's full contact padded stick lightweight	14 May
87	Bronze	Ezekyl Habig	Arnis	Men's full contact padded stick bantamweight	14 May
'88	Bronze	Jason Huerte; Elly Jan Nituda; Rheyjey Ortuoste	Sepak takraw	Men's doubles	14 May
89	Bronze	Kurt Lubrica	Kickboxing	Men's low kick –51 kg	15 May
90	Bronze	Jomar Balangui	Kickboxing	Men's low kick –57 kg	15 May
91	Bronze	Honorio Banario	Kickboxing	Men's low kick –71 kg	15 May
92	Bronze	Airon Lance Villamer	Kickboxing	Men's kick light –63 kg	15 May
93	Bronze	Carlo Von Buminaang	Kickboxing	Men's full contact –67 kg	15 May
94	Bronze	Mikko Camingawan	Kickboxing	Men's full contact –54 kg	15 May
95	Bronze	Danny Kingad	Kickboxing	Men's full contact –60 kg	15 May
96	Bronze	Daryl Chulipas	Kickboxing	Men's k1 –51 kg	15 May
97	Bronze	Janna Allysah Catantan; Samantha Catantan; Maricar Matienzo; Justine Gail Tinio	Fencing	Women's team foil	15 May
98	Bronze	Nino Mark Talledo	Arnis	Men's full contact live stick lightweight	15 May
99	Bronze	Jayvee Ferrer	Judo	Men's -90 kg	15 May
100	Bronze	Jeanalane Lopez	Judo	Women's -44 kg	15 May
101	Bronze	Leah Jhane Lopez	Judo	Women's -48 kg	15 May
102	Bronze	Maribel Angana	Wrestling	Women's freestyle 53 kg	15 May
103	Bronze	Grace Loberanes	Wrestling	Women's freestyle 55 kg	15 May
104	Bronze	Cathlyn Gee Vergara	Wrestling	Women's freestyle 59 kg	15 May
105	Bronze	Joseph Chua	Taekwondo	Men's -63 kg kyorugi	15 May
106	Bronze	Dave Cea	Taekwondo	Men's -80 kg kyorugi	15 May
107	Bronze	Jessica Canabal	Taekwondo	Women's -53 kg kyorugi	15 May
108	Bronze	Laila Delo	Taekwondo	Women's -67 kg kyorugi	15 May
109	Bronze	Abdul "Monboy" Barode	E-sports	PUBG Mobile – mixed individual	15 May
110	Bronze	Ran Abdilla; James Buytrago; Jude Garcia; Jaron Requinton	Volleyball	Men's beach	16 May
111	Bronze	John Dexter Tabique	Weightlifting	Men's 89 kg	16 May
112	Bronze	Loella Andersson; Angelica Bengtsson; Jerylou Berdan; Jerymae Berdan; Annica Cahatian; Imma Cruzado; Michelle Cruzado; Grace Embile; Hanna Esteves; Keziah Espidillon; Heidi Hyrylainen; Marika Lehvilla; Sara Porral; Ronnalyn Ranta; Jade Rivera; Roxane Ruiz; Nathalie Lopez Sundin; Pauline Tolentino; Pia Tolentino; Dianne Villegas	Floorball	Women's tournament	16 May
113	Bronze	Prince John Felipe; Shawn Nicollei Felipe; Nathaniel Perez; Samuel Tranquillan	Fencing	Men's team foil	16 May
114	Bronze	Carl Dave Asaneta; Megumi Delgado; Rena Furukawa; Dylwynn Gimena; Jayvee Ferrer; Keisei Nakano; Sean Levyn Panganiban; Ryoko Salinas; Marco Tumampad	Judo	Mixed team	16 May
115	Bronze	Jhonny Morte	Wrestling	Men's freestyle 65 kg	16 May
116	Bronze	Billy Joseph Ang	Jet ski	Runabout 1100 stock	16 May
117	Bronze	Jeric Arce; Mackjohn Niel Pineda; Mark David Puzon	Arnis	Men's team anyo non-traditional open weapon	16 May

== Multiple medalists ==
Rank	Athlete	Sport	Gold	Silver	Bronze	Total
1	Carlos Yulo	Gymnastics	2	2	0	4
2	Teia Salvino	Swimming	1	1	2	4
3	Xiandi Chua	Swimming	1	1	1	3
4	Miguel Besana	Gymnastics	1	1	0	2
4	Jamie Lim	Karate	1	1	0	2
4	Kim Mangrobang	Endurance race	1	1	0	2
4	Janry Ubas	Athletics	1	1	0	2
4	Bambi Zoleta	Soft tennis	1	1	0	2
9	Joseph Arcilla	Soft tennis	1	0	1	2
10	Jasmine Alkhaldi	Swimming	0	3	3	6
11	Jarod Hatch	Swimming	0	2	1	3
11	Jerald Jacinto	Swimming	0	2	1	3
13	Shania Mae Mendoza	Ouk chaktrang	0	2	0	2
13	Junna Tsukii	Karate	0	2	0	2
13	Remon Misu	Karate	0	2	0	2
16	Chloe Isleta	Swimming	0	1	1	2
16	Kylie Mallari	Kun bokator	0	1	1	2
16	Andrew Kim Remolino	Endurance race	0	1	1	2
16	Rhichein Yosorez	Kun bokator	0	1	1	2

== Medal summary ==
=== By sports ===
Sport	1st place, gold medalist(s)	2nd place, silver medalist(s)	3rd place, bronze medalist(s)	Total	Rank
Arnis	6	2	4	12	1
Athletics	4	10	8	22	5
Basketball	1	3	0	4	1
Billiards	0	0	2	2	8
Boxing	4	5	1	10	2
Cricket	0	2	0	2	6
Cycling	0	1	3	4	5
Endurance race	3	2	1	6	1
Esports	2	1	3	6	3
Fencing	0	4	4	8	4
Floorball	0	1	1	2	3
Gymnastics	4	2	2	8	2
Jet ski	0	0	1	1	4
Judo	1	1	5	7	4
Jujitsu	3	1	8	12	3
Karate	2	6	1	9	3
Kickboxing	3	4	8	15	3
Kun bokator	2	6	8	16	4
Kun Khmer	0	1	5	6	5
Obstacle race	4	2	0	6	1
Ouk chaktrang	0	2	3	5	4
Pencak silat	0	2	8	10	7
Pétanque	0	0	1	1	7
Sailing	0	2	1	3	4
Sepak takraw	0	2	1	3	8
Soft tennis	3	1	1	5	1
Swimming	2	6	8	16	5
Taekwondo	6	1	8	15	2
Tennis	1	0	0	1	3
Vovinam	0	2	6	8	7
Weightlifting	2	4	0	6	2
Wrestling	4	7	5	16	4
Wushu	1	1	4	6	8
Total	-	-	-		-

=== By date ===
Day	Date	1st place, gold medalist(s)	2nd place, silver medalist(s)	3rd place, bronze medalist(s)	Total
-1	4 May	2	2	3	7
0	5 May	Opening ceremony			
1	6 May	5	7	10	22
2	7 May	7	10	12	29
3	8 May	5	12	13	30
4	9 May	6	8	16	30
5	10 May	1	5	6	12
6	11 May	1	7	9	17
7	12 May	4	5	4	13
8	13 May	6	8	4	18
9	14 May	9	8	7	24
10	15 May	5	6	19	30
11	16 May	7	8	8	23
12	17 May	Closing ceremony			
Total		58	87	116	260

== Arnis ==
=== Anyo non-traditional open weapon ===
Athlete	Event	Score	Rank
Crisamuel Delfin	Men's individual	29.500	1st place, gold medalist(s)
Jeric Manuel Arce; Mack John-Neil Pineda; Mark David Puzon	Men's team	28.800	3rd place, bronze medalist(s)
Trixie Lofranco	Women's individual	29.500	1st place, gold medalist(s)
Mary All-In Aldeguer; Jeanette Agapito; Crystal Jane Sapio	Women's team	28.900	2nd place, silver medalist(s)

=== Full contact ===
Men's

Athlete	Event	Semifinals	Final	
Athlete	Event	Opposition Score	Opposition Score	Rank
Dexler Bolambao	Live stick – Bantamweight	Phạm (VIE); W 3–0	Ty (CAM); W 3–0	1st place, gold medalist(s)
Niño Mark Talledo	Live stick – Lightweight	Trương (VIE); L 0–3	Did not advance	3rd place, bronze medalist(s)
Ezekyl Habig	Padded stick – Bantamweight	Văn (VIE); L 1–2	Did not advance	3rd place, bronze medalist(s)
Noah Gonzales	Padded stick – Lightweight	Bùi (VIE); L 1–2	Did not advance	3rd place, bronze medalist(s)

Women's

Athlete	Event	Semifinals	Final	
Athlete	Event	Opposition Score	Opposition Score	Rank
Maria Ella Alcoseba	Live stick – Bantamweight	Nguyễn (VIE); W 3–0	Moe (MYA); W 3–0	1st place, gold medalist(s)
Jude Oliver Marie Rodriguez	Live stick – Lightweight	Thandar (MYA); W 3–0	Vũ (VIE); L 1–2	2nd place, silver medalist(s)
Charlotte Ann Tolentino	Padded stick – Bantamweight	Peou (CAM); W 2–0	Moe (MYA); W 2–0	1st place, gold medalist(s)
Jedah-Mae Soriano	Padded stick – Lightweight	Đào (VIE); W 2–0	Suon (CAM); W 2–0	1st place, gold medalist(s)

== Athletics ==
Men's

Athlete	Event	Heats			Final	
Athlete	Event	Heat	Time	Rank	Time	Rank
Anfernee Lopena	100m	2	10.86	5	Did not advance	
Anfernee Lopena	200m	2	22.10	7	Did not advance	
Frederick Ramirez	400m	2	47.12	2Q	46.63	3rd place, bronze medalist(s)
Umajesty Williams	400m	1	47.40	1Q	46.52	2nd place, silver medalist(s)
Edwin Giron	800m	1	3:33.02	8	Did not advance	
Mariano Masano	800m	2	1:53.08	3Q	1:53.96	4
Alfrence Braza	1500m	—N/a			4:00.31	4
Edwin Giron	1500m	—N/a			4:04.27	6
Edward Josh Buenavista	5000m	—N/a			15:07.30	7
Sonny Wagdos	5000m	—N/a			14:36.45	2nd place, silver medalist(s)
Sonny Wagdos	10000m	—N/a			33:00.23	8
Richard Salano	10000m	—N/a			34:12.04	9
Clinton Bautista	110m hurdles	—N/a			14.13	4
John Cabang Tolentino	110m hurdles	—N/a			13.86	3rd place, bronze medalist(s)
Eric Cray	400m hurdles	2	52.73	1Q	50.03	1st place, gold medalist(s)
Alhryan Labita	400m hurdles	1	53.82	2Q	53.89	7
Edward Josh Buenavista	3000m Steeplechase	—N/a			9:17.62	6
Junel Gobotia	3000m Steeplechase	—N/a			8:59.27	5
Clinton Bautista; Ernie Calipay; Anfernee Lopena; John Cabang Tolentino	4 × 100m Relay	—N/a			41.02	5
Michael Carlo del Prado; Frederick Ramirez; Joyme Sequita; Umajesty Williams	4 × 400m Relay	—N/a			3:07.22	1st place, gold medalist(s)
Arlan Arbois	Marathon	—N/a			2:33:27	2nd place, silver medalist(s)
Richard Salano	Marathon	—N/a			DNF	—N/a
Ernie Calipay	High Jump	—N/a			2.01	7
Leonard Grospe	High Jump	—N/a			2.13	5
Elijah Kevin Cole	Pole Vault	—N/a			NH	—N/a
Ernest John Obiena	Pole Vault	—N/a			5.65 MR	1st place, gold medalist(s)
Marvin Rafols	Long Jump	—N/a			7.19	8
Janry Ubas	Long Jump	—N/a			7.85	1st place, gold medalist(s)
Mark Harry Diones	Triple Jump	—N/a			15.70	3rd place, bronze medalist(s)
Ronnie Malipay	Triple Jump	—N/a			15.74	2nd place, silver medalist(s)
John Albert Mantua	Shot Put	—N/a			15.93	7
William Edward Morrison III	Shot Put	—N/a			16.14	5
John Albert Mantua	Hammer Throw	—N/a			42.96	7
John Albert Mantua	Discus Throw	—N/a			45.63	6
William Edward Morrison III	Discus Throw	—N/a			44.14	7
Melvin Calano	Javelin Throw	—N/a			63.96	6
John Paul Sarmiento	Javelin Throw	—N/a			64.23	4

Athlete	Event	100m	LJ	SP	HJ	400 m	110m H	DT	PV	JV	1500m	Total	Rank
Aries Toledo	Decathlon	11.00; 861	7.13m 845	11.39m 569	1.84m 661	51.67; 739	14.74; 881	32.75m 519	4.19m 673	49.91m 587	5:00.63; 556	6,891pts	3rd place, bronze medalist(s)
Janry Ubas	Decathlon	10.98; 865	8.08m 1081	10.95m 543	1.96m 767	54.08; 636	15.64; 774	32.35m 511	4.89m 880	48.56m 567	5:51.80; 299	6,923pts	2nd place, silver medalist(s)

Women's

Athlete	Event	Heats			Final	
Athlete	Event	Heat	Time	Rank	Time	Rank
Kristina Knott	100m	1	11.66	2Q	DNS	—N/a
Kyla Richardson	100m	2	12.40	5	Did not advance	
Kristina Knott	200m	2	24.06	2Q	23.79	4
Jessel Lumapas	400m	—N/a			56.41	5
Maureen Schrijvers	400m	—N/a			54.69	4
Marisolervera Amarga	800m	—N/a			DNS	—N/a
Bernalyn Bejoy	800m	—N/a			2:09.20	4
Joida Gagnao	5000m	—N/a			17:22.48	4
Abiegail Manzano	5000m	—N/a			18:41.76	8
Joida Gagnao	10000m	—N/a			38.27.63	9
Christine Hallasgo	10000m	—N/a			36.41.08	5
Melissa Escoton	100m hurdles	2	14.35	4Q	14.33	7
Jelly Diane Paragile	100m hurdles	1	13.92	3Q	14.01	5
Robyn Brown	400m hurdles	—N/a			56.21	2nd place, silver medalist(s)
Joida Gagnao	3000m Steeplechase	—N/a			10:40.96	2nd place, silver medalist(s)
Abiegail Manzano	3000m Steeplechase	—N/a			11:19.16	4
Kristina Knott; Jessel Lumapas; Kayla Richardson; Kyla Richardson	4 × 100m Relay	—N/a			45.17	5
Bernalyn Bejoy; Robyn Brown; Kyla Richardson; Maureen Schrijvers	4 × 400m Relay	—N/a			3:37.75	2nd place, silver medalist(s)
Christine Hallasgo	Marathon	—N/a			2:50:27	3rd place, bronze medalist(s)
Ruffa Sorongon	Marathon	—N/a			DNF	—N/a
Alyanna Nicolas	Pole Vault	—N/a			NH	—N/a
Natalie Uy	Pole Vault	—N/a			4.00	3rd place, bronze medalist(s)
Jamela De Asis	Shot Put	—N/a			12.46	5
Aira Teodosio	Shot Put	—N/a			11.80	7
Aira Teodosio	Hammer Throw	—N/a			46.21	5
Gennah Malapit	Javelin Throw	—N/a			49.55	2nd place, silver medalist(s)
Evalyn Palabrica	Javelin Throw	—N/a			48.31	3rd place, bronze medalist(s)

Athlete	Event	100m H	HJ	SP	200 m	LJ	JT	800m	Total	Rank
Sarah Dequinan	Heptathlon	14.77; 872	1.72m 879	10.56m 567	26.11; 788	5.74m 771	46.76m 798	2:29.95; 694	5,369pts	2nd place, silver medalist(s)

Mixed

Athlete	Event	Final	
Athlete	Event	Time	Rank
Robyn Brown; Michael Carlo Del Prado; Jessel Lumapas; Umajesty Williams	4 × 400m Relay	3:23.69	3rd place, bronze medalist(s)

== Badminton ==
=== Men's ===
Player	Event	Round of 32	Round of 16	Quarterfinals	Semifinals	Final	
Player	Event	Opposition Score	Opposition Score	Opposition Score	Opposition Score	Opposition Score	Rank
Jewel Albo	Singles	Sok (CAM); W 2–0	Zaw (MYA); W 2–0	Leong (MAS); L 0–2	Did not advance		
Mark Velasco	Singles	Bye	Wardoyo (INA); L 0–2	Did not advance			
Christian Bernardo; Alvin Morada	Doubles	—N/a	Nguyễn; Phạm (VIE); W 2–1	Fikri; Maulana (INA); L 0–2	Did not advance		
Solomon Padiz Jr. Julius Villabrille	Doubles	—N/a	Oupthong; Yorphaisong (THA); L 1–2	Did not advance			
Jewel Albo; Christian Bernardo; Alvin Morada; Solomon Padiz Jr. Ros Pedrosa; Lance Vargas; Mark Velasco; Julius Villabrille	Team	—N/a		Singapore (SGP); L 1–3	Did not advance		5

=== Women's ===
Player	Event	Round of 16	Quarterfinals	Semifinals	Final	
Player	Event	Opposition Score	Opposition Score	Opposition Score	Opposition Score	Rank
Bianca Carlos	Singles	Vũ (VIE); L 0–2	Did not advance			
Mikala de Guzman	Singles	Katethong (THA); L 0–2	Did not advance			
Airah Albo; Thea Pomar	Doubles	Bun; Lim (CAM); W 2–0	Kusuma; Pratiwi (INA); L 0–2	Did not advance		
Alyssa Leonardo; Susmita Ramos	Doubles	Kanlaha; Muenwong (THA); L 0–2	Did not advance			
Airah Albo; Bianca Carlos; Mikala de Guzman; Christel Fuentespina; Eleanor Inlayo; Alyssa Leonardo; Thea Pomar; Susmita Ramos	Team	—N/a	Malaysia (MAS); W 3–0	Indonesia (INA); L 0–3	Did not advance	3rd place, bronze medalist(s)

=== Mixed ===
Player	Event	Round of 16	Quarterfinals	Semifinals	Final	
Player	Event	Opposition Score	Opposition Score	Opposition Score	Opposition Score	Rank
Eleanor Inlayo; Solomon Padiz Jr.	Doubles	Prajogo; Lai (SGP); W 2–0	Kusharjanto; Kusumawati (INA); L 0–2	Did not advance		
Alyssa Leonardo; Alvin Morada	Doubles	Phạm; Thân (VIE); W 2–0	Muenglong; Teeraratsakul (THA); L 0–2	Did not advance		

== Basketball ==
Summary

Team	Event	Qualifying Round							Semifinal	Final / BM	
Team	Event	Opposition Score	Opposition Score	Opposition Score	Opposition Score	Opposition Score	Opposition Score	Rank	Opposition Score	Opposition Score	Rank
Philippines men's	Men's 3x3	Laos; W 21–5	Vietnam; W 21–13	Indonesia; W 21–11	—N/a			1	Thailand; W 21–19	Cambodia; L 15–20	2nd place, silver medalist(s)
Philippines women's	Women's 3x3	Vietnam; L 19–21	Laos; W 21–6	Thailand; W 14–8	—N/a			2	Cambodia; W 21–20	Vietnam; L 16–21	2nd place, silver medalist(s)
Philippines men's	Men's 5x5	Malaysia; W 94–49	Cambodia; L 68–79	Singapore; W 105–45	—N/a			2	Indonesia; W 84–76	Cambodia; W 80–69	1st place, gold medalist(s)
Philippines women's	Women's 5x5	Cambodia; W 114–54	Singapore; W 94–63	Indonesia; L 68–89	Vietnam; W 116–58	Thailand; W 82–70	Malaysia; W 77–63	—N/a			2nd place, silver medalist(s)

== Billiards ==
=== Men's ===
Athlete	Event	Round of 32	Round of 16	Quarterfinals	Semifinals	Final	
Athlete	Event	Opposition Score	Opposition Score	Opposition Score	Opposition Score	Opposition Score	Rank
Alvin Barbero	Snooker 6-red singles	Bye	Sakbieng (LAO); L 3–5	Did not advance			
Alvin Barbero	Snooker singles	Bye	Akani (THA); L 0–4	Did not advance			
Carlo Biado	9-ball pool singles	Bye	Satriyadi (INA); L 7–9	Did not advance			
Johann Chua	9-ball pool singles	Bye	Maung (MYA); L 8–9	Did not advance			
Francisco Pili Dela Cruz	3-cushion carom singles	—N/a	Punyawee (THA); W 1–0	Chandra (INA); W 1–0	Nguyễn (VIE); L 0–1	Did not advance	3rd place, bronze medalist(s)
Efren Reyes	3-cushion carom singles	—N/a	Woo (CAM); L 0–1	Did not advance			
Jefrey Roda	Snooker 6-red singles	Bye	Hein (MYA); L 3–5	Did not advance			
Jefrey Roda	Snooker singles	Sophanith (CAM); L 2–4	Did not advance				
Alvin Barbero; Jefrey Roda	Snooker 6-red doubles	—N/a		Chhay; Hok (CAM); L 3–4	Did not advance		
Alvin Barbero; Jefrey Roda	Snooker doubles	—N/a	Bye	Lim; Moh (MAS); L 0–3	Did not advance		
Carlo Biado; Johann Chua	9-ball pool doubles	—N/a	Bye	Lường; Nguyễn (VIE); W 9–2	Maung; Thaw (MYA); L 5–7	Did not advance	3rd place, bronze medalist(s)

=== Women's ===
Athlete	Event	Quarterfinals	Semifinals	Final	
Athlete	Event	Opposition Score	Opposition Score	Opposition Score	Rank
Rubilen Amit	1-cushion carom singles	Phùng (VIE); L 0–1	Did not advance		
Rubilen Amit	3-cushion carom singles	Jaisuekul (THA); L 0–1	Did not advance		
Chezka Centeno	1-cushion carom singles	Lê (VIE); L 0–1	Did not advance		
Chezka Centeno	3-cushion carom singles	Pheavy (CAM); L 0–1	Did not advance		

== Boxing ==
=== Men's ===
Athlete	Event	Preliminaries	Quarterfinals	Semifinals	Final	
Athlete	Event	Opposition Result	Opposition Result	Opposition Result	Opposition Result	Rank
Mark Lester Durens	Minimumweight	Koebanu (INA); L 0–5	Did not advance			
Rogen Ladon	Flyweight	—N/a	Ilahi (INA); W 5–0	Arridin (MAS); W 4–1	Saengphet (THA); L 0-5	2nd place, silver medalist(s)
Carlo Paalam	Bantamweight	Rangsey (CAM); W 5–0	Bong (MAS); W 5–0	da Silva (TLS); W 5–0	Sugoro (INA); W 5–0	1st place, gold medalist(s)
Ian Clark Bautista	Featherweight	—N/a	Nguyễn (VIE); W RSC–I R3	Naing (MYA); W 5–0	Udin (INA); W 5–0	1st place, gold medalist(s)
Paul Julyfer Bascon	Lightweight	Aung (MYA); W 5–0	Vũ (VIE); W 4–1	Davit (CAM); W KO R2	Juntrong (THA); W 3-1	1st place, gold medalist(s)
James Palicte	Light welterweight	—N/a	Ven (CAM); L 1–4	Did not advance		
Norlan Petecio	Welterweight	—N/a	Bye	Tan (SGP); W 4–1	Sinsiri (THA); L 0-5	2nd place, silver medalist(s)
John Marvin	Light heavyweight	—N/a		Nasredinov (CAM); W 5–0	Jongjoho (THA); L 0-5	2nd place, silver medalist(s)
Markus Cezar Tongco	Heavyweight	—N/a		Đoàn (VIE); L RSC R2	Did not advance	3rd place, bronze medalist(s)

=== Women's ===
Athlete	Event	Quarterfinals	Semifinals	Final	
Athlete	Event	Opposition Result	Opposition Result	Opposition Result	Rank
Nesthy Petecio	Featherweight	Oupaxa (LAO); W RSC R1	Sreysros (CAM); W 5–0	Devi (INA); W 5–0	1st place, gold medalist(s)
Irish Magno	Lightweight	Nam (MYA); W 5–0	Sinadia (INA); W 5–0	Jitapong (THA); L 0-5	2nd place, silver medalist(s)
Riza Pasuit	Light welterweight	Hasanah (INA); W 3–2	Faizal (SGP); W 4–1	Hà (VIE); L 0-5	2nd place, silver medalist(s)

== Floorball ==
Team	Event	Group Stage					Final / BM	
Team	Event	Opposition Score	Opposition Score	Opposition Score	Opposition Score	Rank	Opposition Score	Rank
Philippines men's	Men's tournament	Thailand; W 6–4	Malaysia; W 8–3	Singapore; W 2–1	Cambodia; W 13–3	1	Thailand; L 2–3	2nd place, silver medalist(s)
Philippines women's	Women's tournament	Thailand; L 2–9	Malaysia; D 2–2	Singapore; L 0–5	Cambodia; W 14–3	3	Malaysia; W 4–2	3rd place, bronze medalist(s)

== Football ==
Summary

Key:

- A.E.T – After extra time.
- P – Match decided by penalty-shootout.

Team	Event	Group Stage					Semifinal	Final / BM	
Team	Event	Opposition Score	Opposition Score	Opposition Score	Opposition Score	Rank	Opposition Score	Opposition Score	Rank
Philippines men's	Men's tournament	Indonesia; L 0–3	Cambodia; D 1–1	Timor-Leste; L 0–3	Myanmar; L 0–1	5	Did not advance		
Philippines women's	Women's tournament	Myanmar; L 0–1	Malaysia; W 1–0	Vietnam; W 2–1	—N/a	3	Did not advance		

=== Men's tournament ===
Group A

29 April 2023
16:00

Indonesia	3–0	Philippines
Marselino 45'; Jauhari 89'; Fajar 90+1'

Morodok Techo National Stadium, Phnom Penh
Referee: Rowan Arumughan (India)
2 May 2023
19:00

Philippines	1–1	Cambodia
Cariño 90+3'		Rina 26'

Morodok Techo National Stadium, Phnom Penh
Referee: Nazmi Nasaruddin (Malaysia)
4 May 2023
19:00

Timor-Leste	3–0	Philippines
Mouzinho 14'; Luís 53'; Elias 88'

Morodok Techo National Stadium, Phnom Penh
10 May 2023
16:00

Philippines	0–1	Myanmar
		Thet Hein Soe 55'

Morodok Techo National Stadium, Phnom Penh

=== Women's tournament ===
Group A

3 May 2023
20:00

Philippines	0–1	Myanmar
		Win Theingi Tun 89'

RCAF Old Stadium, Phnom Penh
6 May 2023
19:00

Malaysia	0–1	Philippines
		Bolden 90+6'

RCAF Old Stadium, Phnom Penh
9 May 2023
16:00

Vietnam	1–2	Philippines
Nguyễn Thị Bích Thùy 40'		Bolden 12' (pen.); Long 82'

RSN Stadium, Phnom Penh

== Gymnastics ==
=== Artistic ===
All-around

Athlete	Event	Floor (gymnastics)		Pommel horse		Rings (gymnastics)		Vault (gymnastics)		Parallel bars		Horizontal bar		Total All-Around	
Athlete	Event	Score	Rank	Score	Rank	Score	Rank	Score	Rank	Score	Rank	Score	Rank	Score	Rank
Juancho Miguel Besana	Individual all-around	13.500	5	11.100	15	10.850	16	14.150	4Q	12.200	12	11.900	9Q	73.700	6
John Ivan Cruz	Individual all-around	13.700	2Q	—N/a		10.700	17	14.050	6	12.000	14	11.600	13	62.050	16
Justine Ace de Leon	Individual all-around	13.000	11	10.100	19	10.650	18	14.100	5	12.400	9	—N/a		60.250	17
Jhon Romeo Santillan	Individual all-around	—N/a		11.500	11	—N/a						11.050	18	22.550	30
Jan Gwynn Timbang	Individual all-around	12.550	14	11.750	10Q	11.200	13	13.250	13	11.400	17	11.550	14	71.700	10
Carlos Yulo	Individual all-around	14.350	1	12.650	4	14.150	1Q	15.000	1	14.950	1Q	12.900	3	84.000	1st place, gold medalist(s)
Total	Team all-around	52.550	1	47.000	2	46.900	2	57.300	1	51.550	2	47.950	2	305.250	2nd place, silver medalist(s)

Apparatus Finals

Athlete	Floor (gymnastics)		Pommel horse		Rings (gymnastics)		Vault (gymnastics)		Parallel bars		Horizontal bar	
Athlete	Score	Rank	Score	Rank	Score	Rank	Score	Rank	Score	Rank	Score	Rank
Juancho Miguel Besana	—N/a						14.275	1st place, gold medalist(s)	—N/a		12.100	4
John Ivan Cruz	13.850	1st place, gold medalist(s)	—N/a									
Jan Gwynn Timbang	—N/a		9.450	5	—N/a							
Carlos Yulo	—N/a				14.000	2nd place, silver medalist(s)	—N/a		14.850	1st place, gold medalist(s)	—N/a	

== Hockey ==
Indoor Hockey

Team	Event	Group Stage						Final / BM	
Team	Event	Opposition Score	Opposition Score	Opposition Score	Opposition Score	Opposition Score	Rank	Opposition Score	Rank
Men's	Men's tournament	Thailand; L 0–14	Malaysia; L 0–19	Indonesia; L 0–20	Singapore; L 0–11	Cambodia; L 0–8	6	Did not advance	
Women's	Women's tournament	Thailand; L 0–8	Malaysia; L 0–12	Indonesia; L 1–14	Singapore; L 1–3	Cambodia; L 0–9	6	Did not advance	

== Judo ==
=== Men's ===
Athlete	Event	Round Robin				Round of 16	Quarterfinals	Semifinals	Final	
Athlete	Event	Opposition Score	Opposition Score	Opposition Score	Opposition Score	Opposition Score	Opposition Score	Opposition Score	Opposition Score	Rank
Daryl John Mercado	–55 kg	—N/a				Bye	Htike (MYA) 'W 1–0	Suksai (THA); L 0–100	Did not advance	3rd place, bronze medalist(s)
Shugen Nakano	–66 kg	Guchkov (CAM); W 100–0	Putra (INA); L 0–100	Khounnivath (LAO); W 100–0	Zhou (SGP); W 100–0	—N/a				2nd place, silver medalist(s)
Keisei Nakano	–73 kg	—N/a				Bye	Htet (MYA); W 100–0	Terada (THA); L 0–100	Did not advance	3rd place, bronze medalist(s)
John Viron Ferrer	–90 kg	—N/a				Bye	Karisna (INA); W 100–0	Wei (THA); L 0–1	Did not advance	3rd place, bronze medalist(s)

Kime no Kata

Athlete	Preliminaries		Final	
Athlete	Score	Rank	Score	Rank
Alvin Mendoza; Bryn Quillotes	457.00	4	Did not advance	

=== Women's ===
Athlete	Event	Round of 16	Quarterfinals	Semifinals	Final	
Athlete	Event	Opposition Score	Opposition Score	Opposition Score	Opposition Score	Rank
Maria Jeanalane Lopez	–44 kg	Bye	Nguyễn (VIE); L 0–1	Did not advance		
Leah Jhane Lopez	–48 kg	Bye	Thor (LAO); W 1–0	Hoàng (VIE); L 0–100	Did not advance	3rd place, bronze medalist(s)
Rena Furukawa	–57 kg	Bye		Phương (VIE); W 100–0	Chu (MYA); W 100–0	1st place, gold medalist(s)

Ju no Kata

Athlete	Preliminaries		Final	
Athlete	Score	Rank	Score	Rank
Jewel Ann Rafael; Joemari-Heart Rafael	366.50	3	Did not advance	

=== Mixed ===
Athlete	Event	Round of 16	Quarterfinals	Semifinals	Final	
Athlete	Event	Opposition Score	Opposition Score	Opposition Score	Opposition Score	Rank
Carl Dave Aseneta; John Viron Ferrer; Dylwynn Keith Gimena; Megumi Kurayoshi; Keisei Nakano; Ryoko Salinas	Team	Bye	Cambodia (CAM); W 4–1	Thailand (THA); L 3–4	Did not advance	3rd place, bronze medalist(s)

== Jujitsu ==
=== Duo ===
Athlete	Event	Pool Stage			
Athlete	Event	Opposition Score	Opposition Score	Opposition Score	Rank
Jan Harvey Navarro; Karl Dale Navarro	Men's duo	Deeyatam; Kokaew (THA); L 63.5–68	Mithora; Pikada (CAM); L 59–66	Dihn; Kẻ (VIE); L 59–64	3rd place, bronze medalist(s)
AC Divina; Luan Gutierrez	Women's duo	K Phaophan; P Phaophan (THA); L 50–66	Hoàng; Nguyễn (VIE); L 46–58	Seavheng; Sovalina (CAM); L 48–64	3rd place, bronze medalist(s)
Christopher Galleo; Estie Gay Liwanen	Mixed duo	Lương; Sài (VIE); L 51–60	Mithora; Seavheng (CAM); L 48.5–63.5	Saengsriruang; Yuennan (THA); L 50.5–74	4

=== Ne-waza ===
Athlete	Event	Pool Stage				Quarterfinals	Semifinals	Final / BM	
Athlete	Event	Opposition Score	Opposition Score	Opposition Score	Opposition Score	Opposition Score	Opposition Score	Opposition Score	Rank
Myron Myles Mangubat	Men's ne-waza gi – 62 kg	Cấn (VIE); L 2–4	Eran (SGP); W 5–0	Kuntong (THA); L 0–50	Than (CAM); W 5–0	—N/a			3rd place, bronze medalist(s)
Michael Tiu	Men's ne-waza gi – 69 kg	—N/a				J Slayman (LAO); L 2–4	Did not qualify	Akaksyah (MAS); L 2–4	4
Jan Vincent Cortez	Men's ne-waza nogi – 56 kg	T Slayman (LAO); W 50–0	Đào (VIE); W 0–0	Keadnin (THA); W 7–0	Tang (SGP); L 0–50	—N/a			3rd place, bronze medalist(s)
Marc Alexander Lim	Men's ne-waza nogi – 69 kg	—N/a				Bye	N Lim (SGP); W 9–2	Đặng (VIE); W 50–0	1st place, gold medalist(s)
Kaila Napolis	Women's ne-waza gi – 52 kg	Teh (SGP); W 50–0	Singchalad (THA); W 3–0	Thị (VIE); W 50–0	Khan (CAM); W 2–0	—N/a			1st place, gold medalist(s)
Meggie Ochoa	Women's ne-waza nogi – 52 kg	Phùng (VIE); W 50–0	Teh (SGP); W 13–0	Khan (CAM); L 0–50	Phumthong (THA); W 50–0	—N/a			2nd place, silver medalist(s)
Annie Ramirez	Women's ne-waza nogi – 57 kg	Senatham (THA); W 2–0	Sokhouy (CAM); W 50–0	Lê (VIE); W 50–0	—N/a				1st place, gold medalist(s)

=== Show ===
Athlete	Event	Score	Rank
Jayson Cayari; Raymond Villaraza	Men's show	41	3rd place, bronze medalist(s)
Dianne Bargo; Isabela Montaña	Women's show	40	3rd place, bronze medalist(s)
Ian Patrick Gurrobat; Leslygomez Romero	Mixed show	37.5	4

== Karate ==
=== Kata ===
Athlete	Event	Round 1		Final / BM	
Athlete	Event	Score	Rank	Opposition Score	Rank
John Enrico Vasquez	Men's individual	37.9	2	Khananpao (THA); W 39.4–38.5	3rd place, bronze medalist(s)
Giovanni Apuya; Felix Calipusan; Jeremy Laurence Nopre	Men's team	37.4	3	Cambodia (CAM); L 39.5–39.7	4
Sakura Alforte	Women's individual	40.8	1	Nguyễn (VIE); W 40.8–40.2	1st place, gold medalist(s)
Allison Kyle Quiroga; Rebecca Cyril Torres; Samantha Veguillas	Women's team	38.1	2	Malaysia (MAS); L 36.9–39.1	4

=== Kumite ===
==== Men's ====
Athlete	Event	Quarterfinals	Semifinals	Repechage	Final / BM	
Athlete	Event	Opposition Score	Opposition Score	Opposition Score	Opposition Score	Rank
Jayson Macaalay	60 kg Kumite	Quefi (TLS); W 2–1	Saputra (INA); L 0–7	Ly (CAM); L 3–8	—N/a	
John Matthew Manantan	67 kg Kumite	Bye	Queffi (TLS); W 9–3	—N/a	Chrun (CAM); L 1–2	2nd place, silver medalist(s)
Prince Izmen Alejo	75 kg Kumite	Raghonathan (MAS); L 3–6	Did not advance	Kandou (INA); L 1–5	—N/a	
Alwyn Balican; John Christian Lachica; Kim Masayuki Torres	Team kumite	Indonesia (INA); L 0–3	Did not advance			

==== Women's ====
Athlete	Event	Quarterfinals	Semifinals	Repechage	Final / BM	
Athlete	Event	Opposition Score	Opposition Score	Opposition Score	Opposition Score	Rank
Junna Tsukii	50 kg Kumite	Chon (CAM); W 8–1	Nguyễn (VIE); W 1–1	—N/a	Chandran (MAS); L 1–1	2nd place, silver medalist(s)
Jamie Lim	61 kg Kumite	Nguyễn (VIE); W 5–0	Azli (CAM); W 6–3	—N/a	Chakriya (CAM); W 3–1	1st place, gold medalist(s)
Remon Misu	68 kg Kumite	Bye	Sara (CAM); W 6–4	—N/a	Đinh (VIE); L 4–7	2nd place, silver medalist(s)
Arrianne Isabel Brito	68+ kg Kumite	Bye	San (CAM); W 4–1	—N/a	Songklin (THA); L 1–3	2nd place, silver medalist(s)
Arianne Isabel Brito; Jamie Lim; Remon Misu; Junna Tsukii	Team kumite	Malaysia (MAS); W 2–2	Laos (LAO); W –	—N/a	Vietnam (VIE); L 0–2	2nd place, silver medalist(s)

== Kickboxing ==
=== Full contact ===
Athlete	Event	Quarterfinals	Semifinals	Final	
Athlete	Event	Opposition Score	Opposition Score	Opposition Score	Rank
Mikko Camingawan	Men's –54 kg	Von (CAM); W 3–0	Naksawad (THA); L 0–3	Did not advance	3rd place, bronze medalist(s)
Danny Kingad	Men's –60 kg	Valsripattanachai (THA); W 2–1	X P Nguyễn (VIE); L 0–3	Did not advance	3rd place, bronze medalist(s)
Carlo Von Buminaang	Men's –67 kg	Bye	Sofyan (INA); L 0–3	Did not advance	3rd place, bronze medalist(s)
Renalyn Daquel	Women's –48 kg	Azian (MAS); W 3–0	Saruke (INA); W 2–1	T H N Nguyễn (VIE); L 0–3	2nd place, silver medalist(s)

=== K1 ===
Athlete	Event	Quarterfinals	Semifinals	Final	
Athlete	Event	Opposition Score	Opposition Score	Opposition Score	Rank
Daryl Chulipas	Men's –51 kg	Sangthong (THA); W 2–1	Pattisamallo (INA); L 0–3	Did not advance	3rd place, bronze medalist(s)
Jeremy Pacatiw	Men's –67 kg	Bye	Reco (INA); W 2–1	Hoàng (VIE); L 0–3	2nd place, silver medalist(s)
Claudine Veloso	Women's –52 kg	Nao (CAM); W 2–1	Permkhunthod (THA); W 3–0	Bùi (VIE); W 3–0	1st place, gold medalist(s)

=== Kick light ===
Athlete	Event	Quarterfinals	Semifinals	Final	
Athlete	Event	Opposition Score	Opposition Score	Opposition Score	Rank
Airon Lance Villamer	Men's –63 kg	Bye	Trần (VIE); L 0–3	Did not advance	3rd place, bronze medalist(s)
Jerry Olsim	Men's –69 kg	Rakib (MAS); L 1–2	Did not advance		
Gina Araos	Women's –55 kg	Aemsakun (THA); W 3–0	Chhat (CAM); W 3–0	Pieter (INA); L 0–3	2nd place, silver medalist(s)

=== Light contact ===
Athlete	Event	Quarterfinals	Semifinals	Final	
Athlete	Event	Opposition Score	Opposition Score	Opposition Score	Rank
Rivier Desuyo	Men's –63 kg	Đ T Nguyễn (VIE); L 1–2	Did not advance		
Fitzchel Martine Fermato	Women's –50 kg	Bye	Chan (CAM); W 2–1	Lê (VIE); L 0–3	2nd place, silver medalist(s)

=== Low kick ===
Athlete	Event	Quarterfinals	Semifinals	Final	
Athlete	Event	Opposition Score	Opposition Score	Opposition Score	Rank
Kurt Lubrica	Men's –51 kg	Bye	Huỳnh (VIE); L 0–3	Did not advance	3rd place, bronze medalist(s)
Jomar Balangui	Men's –57 kg	Bye	Q H Nguyễn (VIE); L 1–2	Did not advance	3rd place, bronze medalist(s)
Jean Claude Saclag	Men's –63.5 kg	Bye	Kyttanasilalack (LAO); W 3–0	San (CAM); W 3–0	1st place, gold medalist(s)
Honorio Banario	Men's –71 kg	Rahasia (INA); W 3–0	Tonphosi (THA); L 0–3	Did not advance	3rd place, bronze medalist(s)
Gretel de Paz	Women's –56 kg	Bye	Vy (CAM); W 2–1	Ndapataka (INA); W 3–0	1st place, gold medalist(s)

== Kun bokator ==
=== Men's ===
Combat

Athlete	Event	Quarterfinals	Semifinals	Final	
Athlete	Event	Opposition Score	Opposition Score	Opposition Score	Rank
Robin Catalan	50 kg	Bye	Nang (CAM); W 2–1	Permana (INA); W 3–0	1st place, gold medalist(s)
Ariel Lee Lampacan	55 kg	Bye	Hoàng (VIE); W 3–0	Deb (CAM); L 1–2	2nd place, silver medalist(s)
Phillip Delarmino	60 kg	Bye	Chon (CAM); L 0–3	Did not advance	3rd place, bronze medalist(s)
Ryan Jakiri	65 kg	Pat (CAM); W 3–0	Huỳnh (VIE); L 1–3	Did not advance	3rd place, bronze medalist(s)
Godwin Langbayan	70 kg	Bye	Ngô (VIE); L 0–3	Did not advance	3rd place, bronze medalist(s)

Form and performance

Athlete	Event	Score	Rank
Zandro Fred Cruz Jizmundo	Single bokator spirit	6.74	5
Jasper Jay Lachica	Single phkak	6.17	5
Mark James Lucao	Single bamboo shield	7.75	2nd place, silver medalist(s)
Rick Rod Luarez Ortega	Single bare hands	6.83	5
Don Lee Aliga; Jefferson John Villaflor	Duo (Pair)	6.75	5
Zandro Fred Cruz Jizmundo; James El Mayagma; Rick Rod Luarez Ortega	Bare hands (Team/Trio)	8.08	4

=== Women's ===
Combat

Athlete	Event	Quarterfinals	Semifinals	Final	
Athlete	Event	Opposition Score	Opposition Score	Opposition Score	Rank
Rhichein Yosorez	45 kg	Bye	Phạm (VIE); L 0–3	Did not advance	3rd place, bronze medalist(s)
Kylie Mallari	50 kg	Bye	Dewi (INA); W 2–1	T T T Nguyễn (VIE); L 2–2	2nd place, silver medalist(s)
Mariane Mariano	55 kg	Yoysaykham (LAO); W 2–1	Pertiwi (INA); W 3–0	T T M Nguyễn (VIE); L 1–2	2nd place, silver medalist(s)
Meri Ann Bulaong	60 kg	Bo (CAM); W 2–1	Thatphavong (LAO); W 3–0	Trần (VIE); L 0–3	2nd place, silver medalist(s)

Form

Athlete	Event	Score	Rank
Angel Gwen Derla	Single bamboo shield	8.50	1st place, gold medalist(s)
Mitz Jude Jalandoni	Single phkak	7.08	3rd place, bronze medalist(s)
Kylie Mallari	Single bokator spirit	8.08	3rd place, bronze medalist(s)
Rhichein Yosorez	Single bare hands	7.33	2nd place, silver medalist(s)
Angel Gwen Derla; Jessa Dela Cruz; Shara Julia Jizmundo	Bare hands (Team/Trio)	7.75	3rd place, bronze medalist(s)

=== Mixed ===
Athlete	Event	Score	Rank
Jeremae Beato; James El Mayagma; Mark James Lucao	1 woman defense against 2 men (Team)	7.50	5

== Obstacle race ==
Athlete	Event	Elimination round						Final / BM	
Athlete	Event	Run 1		Run 2		Best Time	Rank	Time	Rank
Athlete	Event	Time	Rank	Time	Rank	Best Time	Rank	Time	Rank
Kevin Dador Pascua	Men's individual	26.190	2	26.783	3	26.190	2QG	26.814	2nd place, silver medalist(s)
Mark Julius Rodelas	Men's individual	25.388	1	25.092	1	25.092	1QG	25.194	1st place, gold medalist(s)
Precious Cabuya	Women's individual	33.627	1	33.128	1	33.128	1QG	32.732	1st place, gold medalist(s)
Kaizen Dela Serna	Women's individual	37.662	2	34.863	2	34.863	2QG	35.522	2nd place, silver medalist(s)
Mervin Maligo Guarte; Jose Mari Miranda; Ahgie Brina Radan; Elias Gahi Tabac	Men's team relay	25.857	1	26.197	2	25.857	2QG	24.470	1st place, gold medalist(s)
Sandi Menchi Abahan; Mecca Cortizano; Marites Nocyao; Milky Mae Tejares	Women's team relay	3:19.564	2	2:40.712	2	2:40.712	2QG	33.730	1st place, gold medalist(s)

== Ouk chaktrang ==
Filipino chess players took part in ouk chaktrang or Khmer chess in the regional meet.

Athlete	Event	Group Stage							Semifinal	Final	
Athlete	Event	Opposition Score	Opposition Score	Opposition Score	Opposition Score	Opposition Score	Opposition Score	Rank	Opposition Score	Opposition Score	Rank
Edmundo Gatus	Men's singles 5-Minute	Naing (MYA); L 0–1	Khumnorkaew (THA); L 0–1	Inthanouphet (LAO); W 1–0	Nguyễn (VIE); L 0–1	Limheng (CAM); L 0–1	—N/a	5	Did not advance		
Angelo Young	Men's singles 5-Minute	Aung (MYA); L 0–1	Kaewfainok (THA); L 0–1	Senglek (LAO); W 1–0	Hoàng (VIE); L 0–1	Chanphanit (CAM); L 0–1	—N/a	5	Did not advance		
Edmundo Gatus	Men's singles 60-Minute	Kakada (CAM); L 0–1	Arunnuntapanich (THA); L 0–1	Aung (MYA); L 0–1	Tin (MAS); L 0–1	Võ (VIE); L 0–1	Yang (LAO); W 1–0	6	Did not advance		
Eugene Torre	Men's singles 60-Minute	Bora (CAM); L 0–1	Saeheng (THA); L 0–1	Wynn (MYA); L 0–1	Khoa (VIE); L 0–1	Inthanouphet (LAO); W 1–0	—N/a	5	Did not advance		
Shania Mae Mendoza	Women's singles 60-Minute	Đoàn (VIE); W 1–0	Aminuddin (MAS); W 1–0	Chuemsakul (THA); D 0.5–0.5	Phonesavanh (LAO); W 1–0	Soe (MYA); D 0.5–0.5	Sokratha (CAM); W 1–0	2Q	Narciso (PHI)W 0.5–0.5	Đoàn (VIE)L 0–1	2nd place, silver medalist(s)
Venice Vicente Narciso	Women's singles 60-Minute	Vũ (VIE); L 0–1	Chua (MAS); D 0.5–0.5	Sukpancharoen (THA); W 1–0	Maly (LAO); W 1–0	Su (MYA); W 1–0	Khemrereaksmey (CAM); W 1–0	2Q	Mendoza (PHI)L 0.5–0.5	Did not advance	3rd place, bronze medalist(s)
Paulo Bersamina; Jan Emmanuel Garcia	Men's doubles 60-Minute	Kumaresan; Singh (MAS); W 2–0	Nguyễn; Phan (VIE); W 1.5–0.5	Maung; Naing (MYA); W 1.5–0.5	Bunmalyka; Leang (CAM); L 0.5–1.5	Senglek; Yang (LAO); W 2–0	Kananub; Timsri (THA); L 0.5–1.5	—N/a			3rd place, bronze medalist(s)
Janelle Mae Frayna; Shania Mae Mendoza	Women's doubles 60-Minute	Soe; Su (MYA); W 2–0	Aminuddin; Chua (MAS); W 1.5–0.5	Chuemsakul; Sukpancharoen (THA); W 1.5–0	Maly; Phonesavanh (LAO); W 2–0	Phạm; Tôn (VIE); L 0.5–1.5	Khemrereaksmey; Sokratha (CAM); W 1.5–0.5	—N/a			2nd place, silver medalist(s)
Rogelio Antonio; Darwin Laylo; Eugene Torre	Men's triples 60-Minute	Dương; Hoàng; Trần (VIE); L 0.5–2.5	Kumaresan; Singh; Tin (MAS); L 2–1	Bora; Limheng; Sideth (CAM); L 0–3	Kananub; Teerapabpaisit; Timsri (THA); L 0.5–2.5	Nay; Nyein; Wynn (MYA); L 1–2	—N/a	5	—N/a		
Rogelio Antonio; Paulo Bersamina; Jan Emmanuel Garcia; Darwin Laylo	Men's Quadruples 60-Minute	Dương; Khoa; Trần; Võ (VIE); L 0.5–3.5	Seng; Sereisambath; Sideth; Vira (CAM); L 0.5–3.5	Arunnuntapanich; Ngammeesri; Saeheng; Teerapabpaisit (THA); L 1.5–2.5	Maung; Nay; Nyein; Win (MYA); W 2.5–1.5	—N/a		4	—N/a		3rd place, bronze medalist(s)

== Sailing ==
Team	Event	Race																TP	NP	Rank
Team	Event	1	2	3	4	5	6	7	8	9	10	11	12	13	14	15	MR	TP	NP	Rank
Jeanson Gimeno Lumapas	Men's Laser	5	4	4	~~6~~	5	5	7 DNE	5	4	4	—N/a					10	49	43	5
John Harold Abarintos Madrigal	Men's IQFoil	2	~~3~~	1	1	2	3	1	2	2	2	3	3	3	2	3	6	39	36	3rd place, bronze medalist(s)
Andrei Frego Tugade	Men's IQFoil youth	2	1	1	~~3~~	2	1	2	2	2	2	~~3~~	1	3	2	3	4	34	28	2nd place, silver medalist(s)
Dhenver John Centino Castillo	Men's RS:One	~~4~~	2	1	1	2	2	1	4	4	3	2	2	—N/a			10	34	30	3rd place, bronze medalist(s)
Teogenes Ambong Vilando	Laser 4.7	4	4	4	4	5	~~6~~	4	5	5	4	—N/a					10	55	44	4
Josa Verzosa Gonzales; Ronello Casillano Castillo	Mixed Optimist	~~8~~; 6	8; 5	8; 7	8; 7	8; 7	8; 7	7; ~~11~~; UFD	8; 7	8; 7	8; 6	—N/a					12; 16	166; 79; 87	147; 71; 76	4

== Soft tennis ==
=== Individual singles ===
Athlete	Event	Pool Stage				Final	
Athlete	Event	Opposition Score	Opposition Score	Opposition Score	Rank	Opposition Score	Rank
Joseph Arcilla	Men's	Yi (CAM); W 4–3	Vongphakdy (LAO); W 4–1	Yannarit (THA); W 4–3	1	Anugerah (INA); W 4–1	1st place, gold medalist(s)
Bambi Zoleta	Women's	Meth (CAM); W 4–1	Jankiaw (THA); W 4–2	de Sousa (TLS); W 4–0	1	Pitri (INA); L 3–4	2nd place, silver medalist(s)

=== Individual doubles ===
Athlete	Event	Pool Stage			Final	
Athlete	Event	Opposition Score	Opposition Score	Rank	Opposition Score	Rank
Bien Zoleta-Mañalac; Bambi Zoleta	Women's	Chhan; Ki (CAM); W 5–0	Arasy; Darlina (INA); W 5–1	1	C Jankiaw; N Jankiaw (THA); W 5–2	1st place, gold medalist(s)

=== Team ===
Athlete	Event	Pool Stage					Semifinals	Final	
Athlete	Event	Opposition Score	Opposition Score	Opposition Score	Opposition Score	Rank	Opposition Score	Opposition Score	Rank
Mark Anthony Arcoseba; Joseph Arcilla; George Patrick Mendoza; Adjuthor Moralde; Sherwin Ray Nugiut; Dheo Talatayod	Men's	Laos (LAO); W 3–0	Indonesia (INA); W 2–1	Cambodia (CAM); L 1–2	Thailand (THA); W 2–1	2	Thailand (THA); L 1–2	Did not advance	3rd place, bronze medalist(s)
Fatima Ayesha Amirul; Virvienica Bejosano; Christy Sañosa; Bambi Zoleta; Bien Zoleta-Mañalac; Noelle Nikki Zoleta	Women's	Indonesia (INA); W 2–1	Laos (LAO); W 3–0	Thailand (THA); W 3–0	Cambodia (CAM); W 3–0	1	Cambodia (CAM); W 2–1	Indonesia (INA); W 3–0	1st place, gold medalist(s)

== Swimming ==
=== Men's ===
Athlete	Event	Heats		Final	
Athlete	Event	Time	Rank	Time	Rank
Rafael Cruz Barreto	50 butterfly	25.09	5	Did not advance	
Rafael Cruz Barreto	50 freestyle	24.06	4	Did not advance	
Rafael Cruz Barreto	100 butterfly	55.67	5	Did not advance	
Rafael Cruz Barreto	100 freestyle	52.27	4	Did not advance	
Jonathan Sebastian Cook	50 breaststroke	30.29	5	Did not advance	
Jonathan Sebastian Cook	100 breaststroke	1:04.43	6	Did not advance	
Jonathan Sebastian Cook	200 breaststroke	2:23.41	4Q	2:22.67	8
Jarod Hatch	50 butterfly	24.30	3Q	23.89 NR	3rd place, bronze medalist(s)
Jarod Hatch	50 freestyle	23.61	4Q	23.31	5
Jarod Hatch	100 butterfly	54.17	3Q	52.91 NR	3rd place, bronze medalist(s)
Jarod Hatch	100 freestyle	50.62	1Q	50.32	5
Jerard Jacinto	50 backstroke	25.77	1Q	25.56 NR	2nd place, silver medalist(s)
Jerard Jacinto	100 backstroke	56.88	1Q	55.99 NR	3rd place, bronze medalist(s)
Rafael Cruz Barreto; Jonathan Sebastian Cook; Jarod Hatch; Jerard Jacinto	4x100 freestyle relay	—N/a		3:26.01	5
Rafael Cruz Barreto; Jonathan Sebastian Cook; Jarod Hatch; Jerard Jacinto	4x100 medley relay	—N/a		3:43.85	6

=== Women's ===
Athlete	Event	Heats		Final	
Athlete	Event	Time	Rank	Time	Rank
Jasmine Alkhaldi	50 butterfly	27.22	2Q	27.02	3rd place, bronze medalist(s)
Jasmine Alkhaldi	50 freestyle	25.70	3Q	25.50	4
Jasmine Alkhaldi	100 butterfly	1:01.67	2Q	1:00.45	3rd place, bronze medalist(s)
Jasmine Alkhaldi	100 freestyle	57.19	2Q	56.12	2nd place, silver medalist(s)
Xiandi Chua	200 backstroke	2:18.54	1Q	2:13.20 MR	1st place, gold medalist(s)
Xiandi Chua	200 individual medley	2:19:67	3Q	2:17.02 NR	4
Xiandi Chua	400 individual medley	—N/a		4:52.08	3rd place, bronze medalist(s)
Thanya Dela Cruz	50 breaststroke	32.79	3Q	32.46	5
Thanya Dela Cruz	100 breaststroke	1:12.07	1Q	1:11.62	4
Thanya Dela Cruz	200 breaststroke	—N/a	DNS	Did not advance	
Chloe Isleta	50 backstroke	30.25	4Q	30.28	8
Chloe Isleta	100 backstroke	1:03.99	1Q	1:03.92	4
Chloe Isleta	200 backstroke	2:21.70	1Q	2:16.19	2nd place, silver medalist(s)
Chloe Isleta	200 individual medley	2:22.37	4Q	2:19.50	7
Miranda Renner	50 butterfly	27.38	3Q	27.08	4
Miranda Renner	100 butterfly	1:02.75	2Q	1:01.96	4
Miranda Renner	100 freestyle	57.81	3Q	57.18	5
Teia Salvino	50 backstroke	28.95	1Q	28.99	3rd place, bronze medalist(s)
Teia Salvino	50 freestyle	26.07	1Q	25.88	5
Teia Salvino	100 backstroke	1:02.71	1Q	1:01.64 MR	1st place, gold medalist(s)
Teia Salvino	200 freestyle	2:09.49	4	Did not advance	
Jasmine Alkhaldi; Xiandi Chua; Miranda Renner; Teia Salvino	4x100 freestyle relay	—N/a		3:47.96	2nd place, silver medalist(s)
Jasmine Alkhaldi; Xiandi Chua; Miranda Renner; Teia Salvino	4x100 medley relay	—N/a		4:11.81	2nd place, silver medalist(s)
Jasmine Alkhaldi; Xiandi Chua; Miranda Renner; Teia Salvino	4x200 freestyle relay	—N/a		8:19.94	3rd place, bronze medalist(s)

=== Mixed ===
Athlete	Event	Time	Rank
Jasmine Alkhaldi; Thanya Dela Cruz; Jarod Hatch; Jerard Jacinto	4 × 100 m medley relay	3:57.00	2nd place, silver medalist(s)

== Table tennis ==
=== Men's ===
Athlete	Event	Group Stage				Round of 16	Quarterfinals	Semifinals	Final	
Athlete	Event	Opposition Score	Opposition Score	Opposition Score	Rank	Opposition Score	Opposition Score	Opposition Score	Opposition Score	Rank
Richard Gonzales	Singles	Yong (SGP); L 0–3	Kang (CAM); L 1–3	A T Nguyễn (VIE); L 1–3	4	Did not advance				
Jann Mari Nayre	Singles	Đ T Nguyễn (VIE); L 0–3	Yin (CAM); L 0–3	Wong (MAS); W 3–2	3	Did not advance				
Richard Gonzales; John Russel Misal	Doubles	—N/a				Bye	Fong; Ng (MAS); W 3–2	Yew; Yong (SGP); L 1–3	Did not advance	3rd place, bronze medalist(s)
Jann Mari Nayre; Edoard Valenet	Doubles	—N/a				Javen; Wong (MAS); L 0–3	Did not advance			

=== Women's ===
Athlete	Event	Group Stage				Round of 16	Quarterfinals	Semifinals	Final	
Athlete	Event	Opposition Score	Opposition Score	Opposition Score	Rank	Opposition Score	Opposition Score	Opposition Score	Opposition Score	Rank
Kheith Rhynne Cruz	Singles	Sawettabut (THA); L 0–3	Bo (CAM); W 3–0	—N/a	2	—N/a	Zeng (SGP); L 1–4	Did not advance		
Emy Rose Dael	Singles	Ho (MAS); W 3–1	Widarahman (INA); L 1–3	Zhou (SGP); L 0–3	3	Did not advance				
Kheith Rhynne Cruz; Rose Jean Fadol	Doubles	—N/a				H N Nguyễn; K D K Nguyễn (VIE); W 3–0	Paranang; Sawttabut (THA); L 0–3	Did not advance		
Emy Rose Dael; Angelou Joyce Laude	Doubles	—N/a				Chang; Im (MAS); L 1–3	Did not advance			

=== Mixed ===
Athlete	Event	Round of 16	Quarterfinals	Semifinals	Final	
Athlete	Event	Opposition Score	Opposition Score	Opposition Score	Opposition Score	Rank
Rose Jean Fadol; Eljey Dan Tormis	Doubles	Đinh; Trần (VIE); L 2–3	Did not advance			
Angelou Joyce Laude; Edoard Valenet	Doubles	Chen; Soeung (CAM); W 3–1	Zeng; Zhe (SGP); L 2–3	Did not advance		

=== Team ===
Athlete	Event	Preliminary Round				Semifinals	Final	
Athlete	Event	Opposition Score	Opposition Score	Opposition Score	Rank	Opposition Score	Opposition Score	Rank
Richard Gonzales; John Russel Misal; Jann Mari Nayre; Eljey Dan Tormis; Edoard Valenet	Men's team	Malaysia (MAS); L 0–3	Laos (LAO); W 3–0	Singapore (SGP); L 0–3	3	Did not advance		
Kheith Rhynne Cruz; Emy Rose Dael; Rose Jean Fadol; Angelou Joyce Laude; Sendrina Andrea Blatbat	Women's team	Thailand (THA); L 0–3	Vietnam (VIE); L 2–3	—N/a	3	Did not advance		

== Taekwondo ==
=== Poomsae ===
Men's

Athlete	Event	Score	Rank
Patrick King Perez	Recognized individual	7.46	1st place, gold medalist(s)
Ian Matthew Corton; Patrick King Perez; Joaquin Dominic Tuzon	Recognized team	7.50	2nd place, silver medalist(s)

Women's

Athlete	Event	Score	Rank
Maria Nicole Anne Labayne; Aidaine Krishia Laxa; Jocel Lyn Ninobla	Recognized team	7.72	1st place, gold medalist(s)

Mixed

Athlete	Event	Score	Rank
Ian Matthew Corton; Jocel Lyn Ninobla	Freestyle pair	7.50	3rd place, bronze medalist(s)
Juvenile Faye Crisostomo; Jeordan Domiguez; Justin Kobe Macario; Zyka Capelo Santiago; Darius Venerable	Freestyle team	6.64	3rd place, bronze medalist(s)

=== Kyorugi ===
Men's

Athlete	Event	Quarterfinals	Semifinals	Final	
Athlete	Event	Opposition Score	Opposition Score	Opposition Score	Rank
Kurt Bryan Barbosa	–54 kg	Korm (CAM); W 2–0	Pang (SGP); W 2–0	Sawekwiharee (THA); W –	1st place, gold medalist(s)
Joseph Chua	–63 kg	Chia (SGP); W 2–1	Sritimongkol (THA); L 1–2	Did not advance	3rd place, bronze medalist(s)
Arven Alcantara	–68 kg	Bye	Mean (CAM); W 2–0	Cho (THA); W 2–0	1st place, gold medalist(s)
Dave Cea	–80 kg	Phạm (VIE); W 2–1	Zuber (MAS); L 1–2	Did not advance	3rd place, bronze medalist(s)
Samuel Morrison	–87 kg	—N/a	Suhaimi (MAS); W 2–1	Armando (INA); W 2–1	1st place, gold medalist(s)

Women's

Athlete	Event	Quarterfinals	Semifinals	Final	
Athlete	Event	Opposition Score	Opposition Score	Opposition Score	Rank
Veronica Graces	–46 kg	Oo (MYA); W 2–0	Prikasih (INA); L 0–2	Did not advance	3rd place, bronze medalist(s)
Jessica Canabal	–53 kg	Bye	Jongkolrattanawattana (THA); L 1–2	Did not advance	3rd place, bronze medalist(s)
Nicole Ann McCann	–57 kg	Nan (MYA); W 2–0	Harnsujin (THA); L 0–2	Did not advance	3rd place, bronze medalist(s)
Laila Delo	–67 kg	—N/a	Tubbs (CAM); L 1–2	Did not advance	3rd place, bronze medalist(s)
Kirstie Alora	–73 kg	—N/a	Cheang (CAM); W 2–0	Nguyễn (VIE); W 2–1	1st place, gold medalist(s)

== Tennis ==
=== Men's ===
Athlete	Event	Round 1	Quarterfinals	Semifinals	Final	
Athlete	Event	Opposition Score	Opposition Score	Opposition Score	Opposition Score	Rank
Michael Francis Eala	Singles	Fitriadi (INA); L 0–2	Did not advance			
Eric Olivarez Jr.	Singles	Bun (CAM); L 0–2	Did not advance			
Francis Alcantara; Ruben Gonzales Jr.	Doubles	Bye	D A Susanto; I A Susanto (INA); W 2–0	Đ T Nguyễn; V P Nguyễn (VIE); W 2–0	Barki; Rungkat (INA); W 2–1	1st place, gold medalist(s)
Michael Francis Eala; Eric Olivarez Jr.	Doubles	Hein; Zin (MYA); W 2–0	Barki; Rungkat (INA); L 1–2	Did not advance		
Francis Alcantara; Michael Francis Eala; Ruben Gonzales Jr.	Team	Thailand (THA); L 0–2	Did not advance			

=== Women's ===
Athlete	Event	Round 1	Quarterfinals	Semifinals	Final	
Athlete	Event	Opposition Score	Opposition Score	Opposition Score	Opposition Score	Rank
Marian Capadocia	Singles	Tararudee (THA); L 0–2	Did not advance			
Khim Iglupas	Singles	Htay (MYA); W 0–2	Chanta (THA); L 0–2	Did not advance		
Khim Iglupas; Shaira Hope Rivera	Doubles	Chua; Yeo (SGP); W 2–0	Rompies; Sutjiadi (INA); L 0–2	Did not advance		
Marian Capadocia; Khim Iglupas; Jenaila Rose Prulla; Shaira Hope Rivera	Team	Bye	Indonesia (INA); L 0–2	Did not advance		

=== Mixed ===
Athlete	Event	Round 1	Quarterfinals	Semifinals	Final	
Athlete	Event	Opposition Score	Opposition Score	Opposition Score	Opposition Score	Rank
Francis Alcantara; Marian Capadocia	Doubles	Phommachack; Songbandith (LAO); W 2–0	Gumulya; Rungkat (INA); L 1–2	Did not advance		

== Volleyball ==
=== Indoor volleyball ===
Team	Event	Preliminary round				Semi Finals / PF	Finals / BM / PF	
Team	Event	Opposition Score	Opposition Score	Opposition Score	Rank	Opposition Score	Opposition Score	Rank
Philippine Women's	Women's tournament	Cambodia; W 3–0; 25–5, 25–5, 25–5	Vietnam; L 0–3; 20–25, 17–25, 19–25	Singapore; W 3–0; 25–17, 25–14, 25–13	2	Thailand; L 0–3; 22–25, 9–25, 12–25	Indonesia; L 1–3; 20–25, 25–22, 22–25, 23–25	4
Philippine Men's	Men's tournament	Indonesia; L 0–3; 18–25, 18–25, 23–25	Cambodia; L 0–3; 18–25, 18–25, 17–25,	Singapore; L 0–3; 23–25, 21–25, 18–25	4	Malaysia; W 3–2; 25–19, 20–25, 25–21, 24–26, 17–15	Singapore; W 3–1; 25–23, 23–25, 25–22, 25–23	5

=== Beach volleyball ===
Team	Event	Preliminary Round					Semifinal	Final / BM	
Team	Event	Opposition Score	Opposition Score	Opposition Score	Opposition Score	Rank	Opposition Score	Opposition Score	Rank
Abdilla; Requinton; Team 1	Men's Beach Volleyball	Timor-Leste; W 2–0; 21-9, 21-13	Cambodia; L 1–2; 19-15, 21-18, 14-16	Vietnam; L 1-2; 18-21, 22-20, 12-15; Golden Match (Garcia/Requinton); L 1-2; 16-21, 21-16, 10-15	Laos; W 2–0; 21-9, 21-8	2	Indonesia; L 0-2; 17-21, 24-26	Vietnam; W 2–1; 21-18, 31-29, 17-15	3rd place, bronze medalist(s)
Buytrago; Garcia; Team 2	Men's Beach Volleyball	Timor-Leste; W 2–0; 21-12, 21-11	Cambodia; W 2–1; 19-21, 21-18, 15-12; Golden Match; W 2-0; 23-21, 21-17	Vietnam; W 2-1; 21-16. 20-22, 15-13; Golden Match (Garcia/Requinton); L 1-2; 16-21, 21-16, 10-15	Laos; W 2–0; 21-11, 21-13	2	Indonesia; L 0-2; 19-21, 16-21	Vietnam; W 2–0; 21-14, 21-15	3rd place, bronze medalist(s)
Pons; Rodriguez; Team 1	Women's Beach Volleyball	Vietnam; W 2-1; 21-17, 18-21, 16-14	Thailand; W 2-0; 22-20, 21-18; Golden Match; L 1-2; 24-22, 13-21, 13-15	Malaysia; W 2-0; 21-19, 21-9	—N/a	3	Did not advance		
Rondina; Gonzaga; Team 2	Women's Beach Volleyball	Vietnam; L 1-2; 18-21, 21-13, 15-17; Golden Match; L 0-2; 15-21, 22-24	Thailand; L 0-2; 14-21, 19-21	Malaysia; W 2-0; 21-9, 21-11	—N/a	3	Did not advance		

== Weightlifting ==
=== Men's ===
Athlete	Event	Snatch		Clean & Jerk		Total	Rank
Athlete	Event	Result	Rank	Result	Rank	Total	Rank
John Ceniza	−61 kg	128	3	169; NR	2	297; NR	2nd place, silver medalist(s)
Dave Pacaldo	−67 kg	131; NR	3	166; NR	4	297; NR	4
John Tabique	−89 kg	140; NR	3	170	3	310; NR	3rd place, bronze medalist(s)

=== Women's ===
Athlete	Event	Snatch		Clean & Jerk		Total	Rank
Athlete	Event	Result	Rank	Result	Rank	Total	Rank
Angeline Colonia	−45 kg	68	3	80	2	148	2nd place, silver medalist(s)
Lovely Inan	−49 kg	78	2	100	2	178	2nd place, silver medalist(s)
Rosalinda Faustino	−55 kg	80	3	104	2	184	2nd place, silver medalist(s)
Elreen Ando	−59 kg	98; MR	1	118; MR	1	216; MR	1st place, gold medalist(s)
Vanessa Sarno	−71 kg	105; MR	1	120	1	225	1st place, gold medalist(s)
Kristel Macrohon	+71 kg	101	4	120	4	221	4

== Wrestling ==
=== Men's ===
Freestyle

Athlete	Event	Preliminaries			Semifinals	Final / BM	
Athlete	Event	Opposition Score	Opposition Score	Rank	Opposition Score	Opposition Score	Rank
Alvin Lobreguito	–57 kg	Phương (VIE); W 3–1	Kaewkhuanchum (THA); W 3–1	—N/a			1st place, gold medalist(s)
Ronil Tubog	–61 kg	Khidzer (SGP); W 4–0	Jumpakam (THA); W 3–1	1	Soeun (CAM); W 4–0	Abidin (INA); W 3–1	1st place, gold medalist(s)
Jhonny Morte	–65 kg	Lim (SGP); L 0–5	Sutdi (THA); W 3–1	2	X Đ Nguyễn (VIE); L 0–5	Lim (SGP); L 1–3	4
Joseph Angana	–70 kg	T S Ngô (VIE); L 0–4	Dawson (LAO); L 0–5	3	Did not advance		
Jefferson Manatad	–92 kg	V L Ngô (VIE); L 0–4	Heng (CAM); W 4–0	—N/a			2nd place, silver medalist(s)
Chino Torres Sy	–97 kg	Mo (CAM); L 1–4	Thepphasouvanh (LAO); W 5–0	—N/a			2nd place, silver medalist(s)

Greco-Roman

Athlete	Event	Preliminaries				Final	
Athlete	Event	Opposition Score	Opposition Score	Opposition Score	Rank	Opposition Score	Rank
Michael Vijay Cater	–55 kg	Đ H Nguyễn (VIE); L 0–4	Theach (CAM); W 4–1	—N/a			2nd place, silver medalist(s)
Noel Noraga	–63 kg	Suparmanto (INA); L 0–4	Chray (CAM); W 4–1	Hinmee (THA); W 3–1	—N/a		2nd place, silver medalist(s)
Chlovelle Van Adolfo	–67 kg	Dawson (LAO); W 4–1	Eng (CAM); W 4–0	—N/a	1	Bùi (VIE); L 1–4	2nd place, silver medalist(s)
Jason Baucas	–72 kg	C M Nguyễn (VIE); L 0–4	Natal (THA); W 3–1	Nguon (CAM); W 4–0	—N/a		2nd place, silver medalist(s)
Jason Balabal	–82 kg	Keo (CAM); W 4–0	Azman (SGP); W 4–0	—N/a			1st place, gold medalist(s)

=== Women's ===
Freestyle

Athlete	Event	Preliminaries				
Athlete	Event	Opposition Score	Opposition Score	Opposition Score	Opposition Score	Rank
Jiah Pingot	–50 kg	Esati (THA); W 3–1	Safitria (INA); W 3–1	T X Nguyễn (VIE); L 0–3	—N/a	2nd place, silver medalist(s)
Maribel Angana	–53 kg	Lim (SGP); W 5–0	Narin (THA); L 1–3	Ayuningtias (INA); L 3–0	Dit (CAM); L 0–5	4
Grace Loberanes	–55 kg	Marimar (INA); L 0–5	Tho-keaw (THA); L 0–5	—N/a		3rd place, bronze medalist(s)
Cathlyn Gee Vergana	–59 kg	Trần (VIE); L 0–4	Srisombat (THA); L 0–4	—N/a		3rd place, bronze medalist(s)
Cristina Vergara	–65 kg	Sambat (CAM); W 4–1	Thammavong (LAO); W 4–0	—N/a		1st place, gold medalist(s)
Jeanmae Lobo	–72 kg	Chea (CAM); L 0–5	Paosavat (LAO); W 4–0	—N/a		2nd place, silver medalist(s)
