= Ouk chaktrang at the 2023 SEA Games =

- Venue: Royal University of Phnom Penh Indoor Hall
- Location: Phnom Penh, Cambodia
- Dates: 29 April – 9 May 2023
- Nations: 7

Ouk chaktrang events at the 2023 SEA Games were held at the Royal University of Phnom Penh Indoor Hall. 7 events, contested by 7 nations, were held from 29 April to 9 May 2023. Ouk chaktrang, or Cambodian chess, is a form of chess similar to Makruk of Thailand.

== Participating nations ==
The competition started from 29 April before the opening ceremony, which is scheduled to be held on 5 May 2023. The preliminary rounds are held earlier than opening ceremony.

There are total 7 countries participating,

- Cambodia
- Laos
- Malaysia
- Myanmar
- Philippines
- Thailand
- Vietnam

== Men's competition ==
=== Singles 5-Minute ===
Group A

Rank	NOC	Played	Win	Draw	Loss	Win Pt.	Loss Pt.	Diff.
1	Cambodia	5	4	1	0	4.5	0.5	+4
2	Vietnam	5	4	0	1	4	1	+3
3	Thailand	5	3	1	1	3.5	1.5	+2
4	Myanmar	5	2	0	3	2	3	–1
5	Philippines	5	1	0	4	1	4	–3
6	Laos	5	0	0	5	0	5	–5

Group B

Rank	NOC	Played	Win	Draw	Loss	Win Pt.	Loss Pt.	Diff.
1	Cambodia	5	4	1	0	4.5	0.5	+4
2	Vietnam	5	4	0	1	4	1	+3
3	Thailand	5	2	2	1	3	2	+1
4	Myanmar	5	2	1	2	2.5	2.5	0
5	Philippines	5	1	0	4	1	4	–3
6	Laos	5	0	0	5	0	5	–5

=== Singles 60-Minute ===
Group A

Rank	NOC	Played	Win	Draw	Loss	Win Pt.	Loss Pt.	Diff.
1	Vietnam	6	6	0	0	6	0	+6
2	Cambodia	6	5	0	1	5	1	+4
3	Thailand	6	4	0	2	4	2	+2
4	Malaysia	6	2	1	3	2.5	3.5	-1
5	Myanmar	6	2	1	3	2.5	3.5	-1
6	Philippines	6	1	0	5	1	5	-4
7	Laos	6	0	0	6	0	6	-6

Group B

Rank	NOC	Played	Win	Draw	Loss	Win Pt.	Loss Pt.	Diff.
1	Vietnam	6	4	0	2	4	1	+3
2	Thailand	5	3	2	0	4	1	+3
3	Myanmar	5	3	1	1	3.5	2.5	+1
4	Cambodia	5	2	1	2	2.5	2.5	0
5	Philippines	5	1	0	4	1	4	-3
6	Laos	5	0	0	5	0	5	-5

=== Doubles 60-Minute ===
Group A

Rank	NOC	Played	Win	Draw	Loss	Win Pt.	Loss Pt.	Diff
1	Thailand	6	6	0	0	6	0	+6
2	Cambodia	6	5	0	1	5	1	+4
3	Philippines	6	4	0	2	4	2	+2
4	Vietnam	6	2	1	3	2.5	3.5	-1
5	Myanmar	6	2	0	4	2	4	-2
6	Malaysia	6	1	1	4	1.5	4.5	-3
7	Laos	6	0	0	6	0	6	-6

=== Triples 60-Minute ===
Group A

Rank	NOC	Played	Win	Draw	Loss	Win Pt.	Loss Pt.	Diff.
1	Thailand	5	5	0	0	5	0	+5
2	Cambodia	5	4	0	1	4	1	+3
3	Myanmar	5	2	1	2	2.5	2.5	0
4	Vietnam	5	2	1	2	2.5	2.5	0
5	Malaysia	5	1	0	4	1	4	-3
6	Philippines	5	0	0	5	0	5	-5

=== Quadruples 60-Minute ===
Group A

Rank	NOC	Played	Win	Draw	Loss	Win Pt.	Loss Pt.	Diff.
1	Thailand	4	4	0	0	4	0	+4
2	Vietnam	4	2	1	1	2.5	1.5	+1
3	Cambodia	4	2	1	1	2.5	2	+0.5
4	Philippines	4	1	0	3	1.5	3	-1.5
5	Myanmar	4	0	0	4	0	4	-4

== Women's competition ==
=== Singles 60-minutes ===
Group 1

Team	Match	Win	Draw	Lost	Win Pt.	Lose Pt.	Diff.
Philippines	7	4	3	0	5	1	+4
Vietnam	6	5	0	1	5	1	+4
Thailand	7	3	3	1	4	2	+2
Myanmar	6	3	1	2	3.5	2.5	+1
Cambodia	6	2	0	4	2	4	-2
Malaysia	6	1	1	4	1.5	4.5	-6
Laos	6	0	0	6	0	6	-6

Group 2

Team	Match	Win	Draw	Lost	Win Pt.	Lose Pt.	Diff.
Vietnam	6	6	0	0	6	0	+6
Philippines	6	4	1	1	4.5	1.5	+3
Malaysia	6	3	2	1	4	2	+2
Thailand	6	3	1	2	3.5	2.5	+1
Myanmar	6	2	0	4	2	4	-2
Cambodia	6	1	0	5	1	5	-4
Laos	6	0	0	6	0	6	-6

=== Doubles 60-minutes ===
Group 1

Team	Match	Win	Draw	Lost	Win Pt.	Lose Pt.	Diff.	Pts.
Vietnam	5	5	0	0	6	0	6	9
Myanmar	4	3	0	1	3.5	1.5	2	6
Philippines	4	3	0	1	3.5	1.5	2	6
Malaysia	6	2	1	3	3.5	4.5	-1	4
Thailand	5	2	1	2	3	3	-1	1
Cambodia	5	1	0	4	1.5	5.5	-4	3
Laos	5	0	0	5	1	6	-5	0

== Medal table ==
* Host nation (Cambodia)

Rank	Nation	Gold	Silver	Bronze	Total
1	Thailand	4	0	1	5
2	Vietnam	2	1	7	10
3	Cambodia*	1	4	1	6
4	Philippines	0	2	3	5
5	Myanmar	0	0	2	2
Totals (5 entries)		7	7	14	28

== Medalists ==
=== Men's events ===
Event	Gold	Silver	Bronze
Singles 5-Minute	Sok Limheng; Cambodia	Nguyễn Quang Trung; Vietnam	Hoàng Nam Thắng; Vietnam
Singles 5-Minute	Sok Limheng; Cambodia	Nguyễn Quang Trung; Vietnam	Nou Chanphanit; Cambodia
Singles 60-Minute	Boonsueb Saeheng; Thailand	Sam Kakada; Cambodia	Võ Thành Ninh; Vietnam
Singles 60-Minute	Boonsueb Saeheng; Thailand	Sam Kakada; Cambodia	Bảo Khoa; Vietnam
Doubles 60-Minute	Thailand; Warot Kananub; Worathep Timsri	Cambodia; Bou Bunmalyka; Yan Sokleang	Philippines; Jan Emanuel Encarnacion Garcia; Paulo Sales Bersanina
Doubles 60-Minute	Thailand; Warot Kananub; Worathep Timsri	Cambodia; Bou Bunmalyka; Yan Sokleang	Vietnam; Nguyễn Quang Trung; Phan Trọng Bình
Triples 60-Minute	Thailand; Warot Kananub; Wisuwat Teerapabpaisit; Worathep Timsri	Cambodia; Chea Sideth; Chheav Bora; Sok Limheng	Vietnam; Dương Thế Anh; Hoàng Nam Thắng; Trần Quốc Dũng
Triples 60-Minute	Thailand; Warot Kananub; Wisuwat Teerapabpaisit; Worathep Timsri	Cambodia; Chea Sideth; Chheav Bora; Sok Limheng	Myanmar; Nay Oo Kyaw Tun; Nyein Chan; Win Zaw Htun
Quadruples 60-Minute	Thailand; Wisuwat Teerapabpaisit; Ekkalak Ngammeesri; Tinnakrit Arunnuntapanich; Boonsueb Saeheng	Cambodia; Chhoy Virak; Bin Kearseng; Chea Sideth; Meng Srey Sambath	Philippines; Rogelio Madrigal Antonio; Darwin Rosales Laylo; Paulo Sales Bersamina; Jan Emanuel Encarnacion Garcia
Quadruples 60-Minute	Thailand; Wisuwat Teerapabpaisit; Ekkalak Ngammeesri; Tinnakrit Arunnuntapanich; Boonsueb Saeheng	Cambodia; Chhoy Virak; Bin Kearseng; Chea Sideth; Meng Srey Sambath	Vietnam; Bảo Khoa; Dương Thế Anh; Trần Quốc Dũng; Võ Thành Ninh

=== Women's events ===
Event	Gold	Silver	Bronze
Singles 60-Minute	Đoàn Thị Hồng Nhung; Vietnam	Shania Mae Garcia Mendoza; Philippines	Venice Vicente Marciso; Philippines
Singles 60-Minute	Đoàn Thị Hồng Nhung; Vietnam	Shania Mae Garcia Mendoza; Philippines	Vũ Thị Diệu Uyên; Vietnam
Doubles 60-Minute	Vietnam; Phạm Thanh Phương Thảo; Tôn Nữ Hồng Ân	Philippines; Janelle Mae Frayna; Shania Mae Garcia Mendoza	Myanmar; Soe Moe Khaing; Su Su Hlaing
Doubles 60-Minute	Vietnam; Phạm Thanh Phương Thảo; Tôn Nữ Hồng Ân	Philippines; Janelle Mae Frayna; Shania Mae Garcia Mendoza	Thailand; Sarocha Chuemsakul; Sirikan Sukpancharoen
