= Judo at the 2023 SEA Games =

- Venue: Chroy Changvar Convention Center
- Location: Phnom Penh, Cambodia
- Dates: 13–16 May

Judo competitions at the 2023 SEA Games took place at the Chroy Changvar Convention Center in Phnom Penh, Cambodia.

Participating nations except the hosts were limited to entering athletes in seven out of the ten individual events.

== Medal table ==
* Host nation (Cambodia)

Rank	Nation	Gold	Silver	Bronze	Total
1	Vietnam	8	1	1	10
2	Thailand	2	5	0	7
3	Cambodia*	1	2	5	8
4	Philippines	1	1	5	7
5	Indonesia	1	0	5	6
6	Laos	0	3	1	4
7	Myanmar	0	1	3	4
8	Singapore	0	0	4	4
9	Malaysia	0	0	2	2
Totals (9 entries)		13	13	26	52

== Medalists ==
=== Kata ===
Event	Gold	Silver	Bronze
Men's kime-no-kata	Vietnam; Nguyễn Cường Thịnh; Tạ Đức Huy	Laos; Chindavone Syvanevilay; Viengvilay Chansy	Cambodia; Meth Lida; Rat Sok Kheng
Men's kime-no-kata	Vietnam; Nguyễn Cường Thịnh; Tạ Đức Huy	Laos; Chindavone Syvanevilay; Viengvilay Chansy	Singapore; Benny Tan; Soh Keng Chuan
Women's ju-no-kata	Thailand; Pitama Thaweerattanasinp; Suphattra Jaikhumkao	Vietnam; Nguyễn Bảo Ngọc; Trần Lê Phương Nga	Laos; Mayouly Phanouvong; Phonevan Syamphone
Women's ju-no-kata	Thailand; Pitama Thaweerattanasinp; Suphattra Jaikhumkao	Vietnam; Nguyễn Bảo Ngọc; Trần Lê Phương Nga	Cambodia; Heng Lyly; Roeun Maly

=== Men's combat ===
Event	Gold	Silver	Bronze
55 kg	Nguyễn Hoàng Thanh; Vietnam	Jetsadakorn Suksai; Thailand	Htike Htike Kyaw; Myanmar
55 kg	Nguyễn Hoàng Thanh; Vietnam	Jetsadakorn Suksai; Thailand	Daryl John Mercado; Philippines
60 kg	Chu Đức Đạt; Vietnam	Soukphaxay Sithisane; Laos	Phou Khi Phok; Cambodia
60 kg	Chu Đức Đạt; Vietnam	Soukphaxay Sithisane; Laos	Muhammad Alfiansyah; Indonesia
66 kg	Dewa Kadek Rama Warma Putra; Indonesia	Shugen Nakano; Philippines	Volodymyr Guchkov; Cambodia
66 kg	Dewa Kadek Rama Warma Putra; Indonesia	Shugen Nakano; Philippines	Zhou Yujie; Singapore
73 kg	Masayuki Terada; Thailand	Shintaro Uno; Cambodia	Qori Amrullah Al Haq Nugraha; Indonesia
73 kg	Masayuki Terada; Thailand	Shintaro Uno; Cambodia	Amir Daniel Abdul Majeed; Malaysia
90 kg	Lê Anh Tài; Vietnam	Wei Puyang; Thailand	John Viron Ferrer; Philippines
90 kg	Lê Anh Tài; Vietnam	Wei Puyang; Thailand	Aaron Ng; Singapore

=== Women's combat ===
Event	Gold	Silver	Bronze
44 kg	Nguyễn Nhạc Như An; Vietnam	Kesone Ouanvilay; Laos	Ma. Jeanalane Lopez; Philippines
44 kg	Nguyễn Nhạc Như An; Vietnam	Kesone Ouanvilay; Laos	Shifa Aulia; Indonesia
48 kg	Hoàng Thị Tình; Vietnam	Wanwisa Muenjit; Thailand	Leah Jhane Lopez; Philippines
48 kg	Hoàng Thị Tình; Vietnam	Wanwisa Muenjit; Thailand	Meli Marta Rosita; Indonesia
52 kg	Nguyễn Thị Thanh Thủy; Vietnam	Saki Yanagiha; Cambodia	Khin Khin Su; Myanmar
52 kg	Nguyễn Thị Thanh Thủy; Vietnam	Saki Yanagiha; Cambodia	Valerie Teo; Singapore
57 kg	Rena Furukawa; Philippines	Chu Myat Noe Wai; Myanmar	Cheng Dalin; Cambodia
57 kg	Rena Furukawa; Philippines	Chu Myat Noe Wai; Myanmar	Lê Ngọc Diễm Phương; Vietnam
70 kg	Haruka Yasumatsu; Cambodia	Supattra Nanong; Thailand	Siti Noor Aisyah Shahabuddin; Malaysia
70 kg	Haruka Yasumatsu; Cambodia	Supattra Nanong; Thailand	Phyo Swe Zin Kyaw; Myanmar

=== Mixed combat ===
Event	Gold	Silver	Bronze
Team	Vietnam; Dương Thanh Thanh; Lê Anh Tài; Lê Huỳnh Tường Vi; Nguyễn Châu Hoàng Lân; Nguyễn Hải Bá; Nguyễn Thị Bích Ngọc	Thailand; Wanwisa Muenjit; Supattra Nanong; Ikumi Oeda; Surasak Puntanam; Masayuki Terada; Wei Puyang	Indonesia; I Dewa Ayu Mira Widari; I Gede Agastya Darma Wardana; I Komang Ardiarta; Maryam March Maharani; Qori Amrullah Al Haq Nugraha; Syerina
Team	Vietnam; Dương Thanh Thanh; Lê Anh Tài; Lê Huỳnh Tường Vi; Nguyễn Châu Hoàng Lân; Nguyễn Hải Bá; Nguyễn Thị Bích Ngọc	Thailand; Wanwisa Muenjit; Supattra Nanong; Ikumi Oeda; Surasak Puntanam; Masayuki Terada; Wei Puyang	Philippines; Carl Dave Aseneta; John Viron Ferrer; Rena Furukawa; Dylwynn Gimena; Keisei Nakano; Ryoko Salinas
