= Wrestling at the 2023 SEA Games =

- Venue: Chroy Changvar Convention Centre
- Location: Phnom Penh, Cambodia
- Dates: 14–16 May 2023

Wrestling competitions at the 2023 SEA Games took place at Chroy Changvar Convention Centre in Phnom Penh, Cambodia from 14 to 16 May 2023.

== Medal table ==
* Host nation (Cambodia)

Rank	Nation	Gold	Silver	Bronze	Total
1	Vietnam	13	4	1	18
2	Indonesia	6	6	2	14
3	Cambodia*	5	4	11	20
4	Philippines	4	7	5	16
5	Thailand	1	5	6	12
6	Singapore	1	3	5	9
7	Laos	0	1	7	8
Totals (7 entries)		30	30	37	97

== Medalists ==
=== Men's Greco-Roman ===
Event	Gold	Silver	Bronze
55 kg	Nguyễn Đình Huy; Vietnam	Michael Cater; Philippines	Thach Socheat; Cambodia
60 kg	Bùi Tiến Hải; Vietnam	Yon Bunna; Cambodia	Eddy Zulqarnain Khidzer; Singapore
63 kg	Suparmanto; Indonesia	Noel Norada; Philippines	Nuttapong Hinmee; Thailand
67 kg	Muhammad Aliansyah; Indonesia	Bùi Mạnh Hùng; Vietnam	Chlovelle Van Adolfo; Philippines
67 kg	Muhammad Aliansyah; Indonesia	Bùi Mạnh Hùng; Vietnam	Dawson Sihavong; Laos
72 kg	Nguyễn Công Mạnh; Vietnam	Jason Baucas; Philippines	Apichai Natal; Thailand
77 kg	Andika Sulaeman; Indonesia	Nguyễn Bá Sơn; Vietnam	Wisit Thamwirat; Thailand
77 kg	Andika Sulaeman; Indonesia	Nguyễn Bá Sơn; Vietnam	Gadiel Misso; Singapore
82 kg	Jason Balabal; Philippines	Aryan Azman; Singapore	Keo Sophak; Cambodia
87 kg	Lulut Gilang Saputra; Indonesia	Nghiêm Đình Hiếu; Vietnam	Chhoeung Veasna; Cambodia
97 kg	Mo Sari; Cambodia	Vansalong Phiathep; Laos	Atthaphol Sirithahan; Thailand
130 kg	Sou Bali; Cambodia	Nanthawat Panphuek; Thailand	Timothy Loh; Singapore

=== Men's freestyle ===
Event	Gold	Silver	Bronze
57 kg	Alvin Lobreguito; Philippines	Phùng Khắc Huy; Vietnam	Nattawut Kaewkhuanchum; Thailand
61 kg	Ronil Tubog; Philippines	Zainal Abidin; Indonesia	Siripong Jumpakam; Thailand
61 kg	Ronil Tubog; Philippines	Zainal Abidin; Indonesia	Soeun Sophors; Cambodia
65 kg	Nguyễn Xuân Định; Vietnam	Hamka; Indonesia	Lim Zi Xyan; Singapore
65 kg	Nguyễn Xuân Định; Vietnam	Hamka; Indonesia	Jhonny Morte; Philippines
70 kg	Ngô Thế Sao; Vietnam	Dawson Sihavong; Laos	Ardiansyah Darmansyah; Indonesia
70 kg	Ngô Thế Sao; Vietnam	Dawson Sihavong; Laos	Chhoeun Chheang; Cambodia
74 kg	Cấn Tất Dự; Vietnam	Rachmat Hadi Wijaya; Indonesia	Parinya Chamnanjan; Thailand
74 kg	Cấn Tất Dự; Vietnam	Rachmat Hadi Wijaya; Indonesia	Lou Hong Yeow; Singapore
79 kg	Randa Riandesta; Indonesia	Gary Chow; Singapore	Ol Saoheng; Cambodia
86 kg	Heng Vuthy; Cambodia	Chiranuwat Chamnanjan; Thailand	Trần Văn Trường Vũ; Vietnam
92 kg	Ngô Văn Lâm; Vietnam	Jefferson Manatad; Philippines	Heng Rottha; Cambodia
97 kg	Mo Sari; Cambodia	Chino Sy Tancontian; Philippines	Asien Thepphasouvanh; Laos
125 kg	Timothy Loh; Singapore	Dorn Sao; Cambodia	Lerdxai Khamthama; Laos

=== Women's freestyle ===
Event	Gold	Silver	Bronze
50 kg	Nguyễn Thị Xuân; Vietnam	Jiah Pingot; Philippines	Anissa Safitria; Indonesia
53 kg	Mutiara Ayuningtyas; Indonesia	Nadia Narin; Thailand	Dit Samnang; Cambodia
53 kg	Mutiara Ayuningtyas; Indonesia	Nadia Narin; Thailand	Maribel Angana; Philippines
55 kg	Sriprapa Tho-kaew; Thailand	Candra Marimar; Indonesia	Grace Loberanes; Philippines
57 kg	Nguyễn Thị Mỹ Trang; Vietnam	Danielle Lim; Singapore	Sim Keatha; Cambodia
59 kg	Trần Ánh Tuyết; Vietnam	Salinee Srisombat; Thailand	Cathlyn Vergara; Philippines
62 kg	Nguyễn Thị Mỹ Hạnh; Vietnam	Kharisma Tantri Herlina; Indonesia	Chhoeun Sreylen; Cambodia
65 kg	Maria Cristina Vergara; Philippines	Sambat Vannak; Cambodia	Sopha Thammavong; Laos
68 kg	Lại Diệu Thương; Vietnam	Soeurn Noeurn; Cambodia	Vanmixay Soulisa; Laos
72 kg	Chea Kanha; Cambodia	Jean Mae Lobo; Philippines	Phonexai Paosavat; Laos
76 kg	Đặng Thị Linh; Vietnam	Varadisa Septi Putri Hidayat; Indonesia	Jezamine Chua; Singapore
