= Obstacle racing at the 2023 SEA Games =

Obstacle race at the 2023 SEA Games
- Venue: Chroy Changvar Convention Centre, Phnom Penh
- Dates: 3 – 6 May 2023

Obstacle race competitions at the 2023 SEA Games were held at the Chroy Changvar Convention Centre from 3 May to 6 May 2023 and the game featured 4 events. The Philippines won gold in all events.

== Competition ==
The obstacle course will be 12 obstacles over a 100 m distance.

== Medal summary ==
=== Medal table ===
* Host nation (Cambodia)

Rank	Nation	Gold	Silver	Bronze	Total
1	Philippines (PHI)	4	2	0	6
2	Malaysia (MAS)	0	1	3	4
3	Indonesia (INA)	0	1	2	3
4	Cambodia (CAM)*	0	0	1	1
Totals (4 entries)		4	4	6	14

=== Medalist ===
Event	Gold	Silver	Bronze
Men's individual	Mark Julius Rodelas; Philippines	Kevin Dador Pascua; Philippines	Yoong Wei Theng; Malaysia
Men's individual	Mark Julius Rodelas; Philippines	Kevin Dador Pascua; Philippines	Ol Saoheng; Cambodia
Men's team relay	Philippines; Ahgie Brina Radan; Elias Gahi Tabac; Jose Mari Miranda De Castrc; Mervin Maligg Guarte	Malaysia; Ghalib Mohamad Azimi; Mohd Redha Rozlan; Nuur Hafis Said Alwi; Yoong Wei Theng	Indonesia; Angga Cahya; Fahrun; Panji Mohamad Paisal; Putra Waluya Nuryayi
Women's individual	Precious Satarain; Philippines	Kaizen Cipriano; Philippines	Anggun Yolanda Samsul Hadi; Indonesia
Women's individual	Precious Satarain; Philippines	Kaizen Cipriano; Philippines	Wan Atirah Hidayah Ahmad Fuzli; Malaysia
Women's team relay	Philippines; Marites Nocyao; Mecca Cortizano; Milky Mae Tejares; Sandi Menchi Abahan	Indonesia; Anggun Yolanda Samsul Hadi; Ayu Puspita Sari; Mudji Mulyani; Rahmayuna Fadillah	Malaysia; Ong Sher Lyn; Tan Sui Lin Renee; Wan Athirah Hidayah Ahmad Fuzli; Yip Hui Teng

== Results ==
=== Men's individual ===
Elimination Round

Rank	Athlete	Time				Best Time	Notes
Rank	Athlete	Run 1	Rank	Run 2	Rank	Best Time	Notes
1	Mark Julius Rodelas (PHI)	0:25.388	1	0:25.092	1	0:25.092	QG
2	Kevin Dador Pascua (PHI)	0:26.190	2	0:26.783	3	0:26.190	QG
3	Ol Saoheng (CAM)	0:27.106	4	0:26.475	2	0:26.475	QB
4	Yoong Wei Theng (MAS)	0:26.549	3	0:50.774	7	0:26.549	QB
5	Nuur Hafis Said Alwi (MAS)	0:27.358	5	0:27.230	4	0:27.230	
6	Deuanepheng Chandavong (LAO)	0:39.691	6	0:50.438	6	0:39.691	
7	Oun Tola (CAM)	0:43.730	7	1:01.029	9	0:43.730	
8	Fahrun (INA)	0:44.468	8	0:44.024	5	0:44.024	
9	Ak Muhd Nur'Nazirul Mubin (BRU)	0:53.854	9	1:00.126	8	0:53.854	
10	Muhd Hasnal Husna Ahmad (BRU)	1:03.296	10	1:01.029	10	1:01.029	

Finals

Rank	Athlete	Time
Gold medal final
1st place, gold medalist(s)	Mark Julius Rodelas (PHI)	25.194
2nd place, silver medalist(s)	Kevin Dador Pascua (PHI)	26.814
Bronze medal final
3rd place, bronze medalist(s)	Yoong Wei Theng (MAS)	28.234
3rd place, bronze medalist(s)	Ol Saoheng (CAM)	DNF

=== Men's team relay ===
Elimination Round

Rank	Athlete	Time				Best Time	Notes
Rank	Athlete	Run 1	Rank	Run 2	Rank	Best Time	Notes
1	Malaysia; Ghabis Mohamad Azimi; Mohd Redha Rozlan; Nuur Hafis Said Alwi; Yoong Wei Theng	DNS	—	0:25.624	1	0:25.624	QG
2	Philippines; Ahgie Brina Radan; Elias Gahi Tabac; Jose Mari Miranda; Mervin Maligo Guarte	0:25.857	1	0:26.197	2	0:25.857	QG
3	Indonesia; Angga Cahya; Fahrun; Panji Mohamad Paisal; Putra Waluya Nuryayi	0:25.879	2	0:39.554	6	0:25.879	QB
4	Laos; Bounloth Keoviset; Dola Nhoisaykham; Keo Oudone Vongphachanh; Laddy Xaysamone	0:28.032	3	0:29.251	3	0:28.032	QB
5	Cambodia; Chon Sokhon; Men Devith; Sor Khatse	1:12.165	5	0:29.977	4	0:29.977	
6	Brunei; Ak Muhammad Habibullah Pg Hj Jufri; Ak Muhd Nur'Nazirul Mubin; Azizil Anwar Mosli; Muhd Hasnal Husna Ahmad	0:39.028	4	0:30.327	5	0:30.327	

Finals

Rank	Athlete	Time
Gold medal final
1st place, gold medalist(s)	Philippines; Ahgie Brina Radan; Elias Gahi Tabac; Jose Mari Miranda; Mervin Maligo Guarte	0:24.47
2nd place, silver medalist(s)	Malaysia; Ghabis Mohamad Azimi; Mohd Redha Rozlan; Nuur Hafis Said Alwi; Yoong Wei Theng	0:25.15
Bronze medal final
3rd place, bronze medalist(s)	Indonesia; Angga Cahya; Fahrun; Panji Mohamad Paisal; Putra Waluya Nuryayi	0:31.27
	Laos; Bounloth Keoviset; Dola Nhoisaykham; Keo Oudone Vongphachanh; Laddy Xaysamone	0:34.11

=== Women's individual ===
Elimination Round

Rank	Athlete	Time				Best Time	Notes
Rank	Athlete	Run 1	Rank	Run 2	Rank	Best Time	Notes
1	Precious Satarain (PHI)	0:33.627	1	0:33.128	1	0:33.128	QG
2	Kaizen Cipriano (PHI)	0:37.662	2	0:34.863	2	0:34.863	QG
3	Anggun Yolanda Samsul Hadi (INA)	0:47.242	3	0:41.219	3	0:41.219	QB
4	Wan Atirah Hidayah Ahmad Fuzli (MAS)	2:00.000	7	1:01.872	4	1:01.872	QB
5	Mudji Mulyani (INA)	1:20.541	4	1:20.541	5	1:20.541	
7	Touch Sreytoch (CAM)	2:00.000	7	2:00.000	7	2:00.000	
7	Yin Pi Sey (CAM)	2:00.000	7	2:00.000	7	2:00.000	

Finals

Rank	Athlete	Time
Gold medal final
1st place, gold medalist(s)	Precious Satarain (PHI)	32.732
2nd place, silver medalist(s)	Kaizen Cipriano (PHI)	35.522
Bronze medal final
3rd place, bronze medalist(s)	Anggun Yolanda Samsul Hadi (INA)	39.598
3rd place, bronze medalist(s)	Wan Atirah Hidayah Ahmad Fuzli (MAS)	41.724

=== Women's team relay ===
Elimination Round

Rank	Athlete	Time				Best Time	Notes
Rank	Athlete	Run 1	Rank	Run 2	Rank	Best Time	Notes
1	Indonesia; Anggun Yolanda Samsul Hadi; Ayu Puspita Sari; Mudji Mulyani; Rahmayuna Fadillah	2:26.312	1	2:20.172	1	2:20.172	QG
2	Philippines; Marites Capablanca Nocyao; Mecca Llantino Cortizano; Milky Mae Navea Tejares; Sandi Menchi Catlona Abahan	3:19.564	2	2:40.712	2	2:40.712	QG
3	Malaysia; Ong Sher Lyn; Tan Sui Lin Renee; Wan Atirah Hidayah Ahmad Fuzli; Yip Hui Theng	3:45.908	3	3:12.980	3	3:12.980	QB
4	Cambodia; Dorn Srors; Touch Sreytoch; Yin Pi Sey; Yun Daneth	DNS	4	6:40.748	4	6:40.748	QB

Finals

Rank	Athlete	Time
Gold medal final
1st place, gold medalist(s)	Philippines; Marites Capablanca Nocyao; Mecca Llantino Cortizano; Milky Mae Navea Tejares; Sandi Menchi Catlona Abahan	0:33.73
2nd place, silver medalist(s)	Indonesia; Anggun Yolanda Samsul Hadi; Ayu Puspita Sari; Mudji Mulyani; Rahmayuna Fadillah	0:35.06
Bronze medal final
3rd place, bronze medalist(s)	Malaysia; Ong Sher Lyn; Tan Sui Lin Renee; Wan Atirah Hidayah Ahmad Fuzli; Yip Hui Theng	0:41.00
	Cambodia; Dorn Srors; Touch Sreytoch; Yin Pi Sey; Yun Daneth	
