= Arnis at the 2023 SEA Games =

- Venue: Changvar Convention Centre
- Location: Phnom Penh, Cambodia
- Dates: 14–16 May 2023

Arnis competitions at the 2023 SEA Games took place at Hall A, Changvar Convention Centre in Phnom Penh from 14 to 16 May 2023. Medals were awarded in 12 events.

Cambodia was the first nation other than the Philippines, the sport's country of origin, to hold arnis in the regional meet.

== Participating nations ==
- Cambodia (host)
- Myanmar
- Philippines
- Vietnam

== Medal table ==
* Host nation (Cambodia)

Rank	Nation	Gold	Silver	Bronze	Total
1	Philippines	6	2	4	12
2	Cambodia*	2	6	4	12
3	Myanmar	2	2	8	12
3	Vietnam	2	2	8	12
Totals (4 entries)		12	12	24	48

== Medalists ==
=== Men ===
==== Livestick ====
Event	Gold	Silver	Bronze
Bantamweight	Dexler Bolambao; Philippines	Ty Prakponlue; Cambodia	Paing Win Thet; Myanmar
Bantamweight	Dexler Bolambao; Philippines	Ty Prakponlue; Cambodia	Phạm Văn Phương; Vietnam
Lightweight	Thuon Narak; Cambodia	Trương Văn Cường; Vietnam	Niño Mark Talledo; Philippines
Lightweight	Thuon Narak; Cambodia	Trương Văn Cường; Vietnam	Lu Min Oo; Myanmar

==== Padded stick ====
Event	Gold	Silver	Bronze
Bantamweight	Si Thu Maung; Myanmar	Văn Công Quốc; Vietnam	Sok Bunyung; Cambodia
Bantamweight	Si Thu Maung; Myanmar	Văn Công Quốc; Vietnam	Ezekyl Habig; Philippines
Lightweight	Bùi Đình Quyết; Vietnam	Yong Mengly; Cambodia	Noah Gonzales; Philippines
Lightweight	Bùi Đình Quyết; Vietnam	Yong Mengly; Cambodia	Wine That Aung; Myanmar

==== Anyo ====
Event	Gold	Silver	Bronze
Individual non-traditional open weapon	Crisamuel Delfin; Philippines	Run Salith; Cambodia	Htet Wai Hlaing; Myanmar
Individual non-traditional open weapon	Crisamuel Delfin; Philippines	Run Salith; Cambodia	Đinh Phúc An; Vietnam
Team non-traditional open weapon	Myanmar; Aung Zhaw Thet; Myo Htun Ant; Ye Zaw Moe	Cambodia; Moeun Bunly; Prum Penhpisal; Von Soksreypiseth	Philippines; Jeric Arce; Mack Pineda; Mark Puzon
Team non-traditional open weapon	Myanmar; Aung Zhaw Thet; Myo Htun Ant; Ye Zaw Moe	Cambodia; Moeun Bunly; Prum Penhpisal; Von Soksreypiseth	Vietnam; Đặng Thành Công; Vũ Cuồng Tiên; Hoàng Tiến Thành

=== Women ===
==== Livestick ====
Event	Gold	Silver	Bronze
Bantamweight	Maria Alcoseba; Philippines	Moe Moe Aye; Myanmar	Pok Phalla; Cambodia
Bantamweight	Maria Alcoseba; Philippines	Moe Moe Aye; Myanmar	Nguyễn Thị Yến Linh; Vietnam
Lightweight	Vũ Thị Thanh Bình; Vietnam	Jude Oliver Rodriguez; Philippines	Chhoun Vichika; Cambodia
Lightweight	Vũ Thị Thanh Bình; Vietnam	Jude Oliver Rodriguez; Philippines	Thandar Khaing; Myanmar

==== Padded stick ====
Event	Gold	Silver	Bronze
Bantamweight	Charlotte Tolentino; Philippines	Moe Moe Aye; Myanmar	Peou Moonrila; Cambodia
Bantamweight	Charlotte Tolentino; Philippines	Moe Moe Aye; Myanmar	Nguyễn Thị Trang Chi; Vietnam
Lightweight	Jedah Mae Soriano; Philippines	Suon Heang Sela; Cambodia	Thandar Khaing; Myanmar
Lightweight	Jedah Mae Soriano; Philippines	Suon Heang Sela; Cambodia	Đào Thị Hồng Nhung; Vietnam

==== Anyo ====
Event	Gold	Silver	Bronze
Individual non-traditional open weapon	Trixie Lofranco; Philippines	Lath Sophandaroth; Cambodia	Khin Khin Khant; Myanmar
Individual non-traditional open weapon	Trixie Lofranco; Philippines	Lath Sophandaroth; Cambodia	Nguyễn Thị Thảo; Vietnam
Team non-traditional open weapon	Cambodia; Hoem Lyhouy; La Bunmary; Treng Phalin	Philippines; Jeanette Agapito; Ma. Crystal Sapio; Mary Aldeguer	Myanmar; Hlaing Phoo Wai; Kay Khaing Kyaw; Khine Kyawt Kyawt Wai
Team non-traditional open weapon	Cambodia; Hoem Lyhouy; La Bunmary; Treng Phalin	Philippines; Jeanette Agapito; Ma. Crystal Sapio; Mary Aldeguer	Vietnam; Lương Thị Dung; Đặng Thị Hiền; Hà Thị Phương
