= Soft tennis at the 2023 SEA Games =

- Venue: Olympic Complex
- Location: Phnom Penh, Cambodia
- Dates: 6–10 May 2023

Soft tennis competitions at the 2023 SEA Games were held from 6–10 May 2023. The events were held in Tennis Sports Center, Olympic Complex. Total 7 medals were awarded in two events combined.

== Medal table ==
* Host nation (Cambodia)

Rank	Nation	Gold	Silver	Bronze	Total
1	Philippines	3	1	1	5
2	Cambodia*	2	2	4	8
3	Indonesia	2	2	1	5
4	Thailand	0	2	3	5
5	Laos	0	0	3	3
Totals (5 entries)		7	7	12	26

== Medal summary ==
Event	Gold	Silver	Bronze
Men's singles	Joseph Arcilla; Philippines	M. Hemat Bhakti Anugerah; Indonesia	Orn Sambath; Cambodia
Men's singles	Joseph Arcilla; Philippines	M. Hemat Bhakti Anugerah; Indonesia	Kawin Yannarit; Thailand
Women's singles	Dwi Rahayu Pitri; Indonesia	Bambi Zoleta; Philippines	Napawee Jankiaw; Thailand
Women's singles	Dwi Rahayu Pitri; Indonesia	Bambi Zoleta; Philippines	Hour Sreypov; Cambodia
Men's doubles	Cambodia; John Mada; Kann Sophorn	Cambodia; Doeum Samsocheaphearun; Yi Sarsarith	Laos; Anandone Khampouy; Lang Xa Somboun
Women's doubles	Philippines; Princess Catindig; Bien Zoleta-Mañalac	Thailand; Chatmanee Jankiaw; Napawee Jankiaw	Indonesia; Siti Nur Arasy; Voni Darlina
Women's doubles	Philippines; Princess Catindig; Bien Zoleta-Mañalac	Thailand; Chatmanee Jankiaw; Napawee Jankiaw	Laos; Kinnally Sengchanh; Pankeo Teso
Mixed doubles	Cambodia; Sam Chankaby; Khun Chanroseka	Cambodia; Say Sochetra; Ho Sreynoch	Laos; Anandone Khamphoumy; Pankeo Teso
Men's team	Indonesia; Fernando Sanger; Mario Harley Alibasa; M. Hemat Bhakti Anugerah; Sunu Wahyu Trijati; Tio Juliandi Hutauruk	Thailand; Anawat Ger-a-prasitt; Supakit Jaroensil; Prasroedchai Nakphacharoensap; Phakkapon Thienchaipong; Sippakorn Thong-ngiu; Kawin Yannarit	Cambodia; Doeum Samsocheaphearun; John Mada; Kann Sophorn; Orn Sambath; Yi Keavirak; Yi Sarsarith
Men's team	Indonesia; Fernando Sanger; Mario Harley Alibasa; M. Hemat Bhakti Anugerah; Sunu Wahyu Trijati; Tio Juliandi Hutauruk	Thailand; Anawat Ger-a-prasitt; Supakit Jaroensil; Prasroedchai Nakphacharoensap; Phakkapon Thienchaipong; Sippakorn Thong-ngiu; Kawin Yannarit	Philippines; Mark Anthony Alcoseba; Joseph Arcilla; Adjuthor Moralde; George Mendoza; Sherwin Nuguit; Dheo Talatayod
Women's team	Philippines; Princess Catindig; Bien Zoleta-Mañalac; Christy Sañosa; Fatima Ayesha Amirul; Bambi Zoleta; Virvienica Isearis Bejosano	Indonesia; Allif Nafiiah; Dwi Rahayu Pitri; Sharon Cornelia Watupongoh; Siti Nur Arasy; Voni Darlina	Thailand; Pimchanok Gerprasith; Chatmanee Jankiaw; Chatcha Klomkamol; Nannapas Lamthanthong; Thanpitcha Somsanit
Women's team	Philippines; Princess Catindig; Bien Zoleta-Mañalac; Christy Sañosa; Fatima Ayesha Amirul; Bambi Zoleta; Virvienica Isearis Bejosano	Indonesia; Allif Nafiiah; Dwi Rahayu Pitri; Sharon Cornelia Watupongoh; Siti Nur Arasy; Voni Darlina	Cambodia; Chen Sreyloy; Ho Sreynoch; Khun Chanroseka; Ki Mengchoung; Meth Mariyan; Yean Sokhoeun
