= Đào Hồng Sơn =

Vietnamese martial artist (born 1997)

- Born: 29 December 1997 (age 28); Thanh Trì, Hanoi, Vietnam
- Other names: Quỷ lùn (The Goblin)
- Nationality: Vietnam
- Height: 1.49 m (4 ft 11 in)
- Weight: 56 kg (123 lb)
- Division: Strawweight; Flyweight
- Style: Jujitsu (Ne-Waza Nogi); Judo; Traditional wrestling
- Fighting out of: Hanoi, Vietnam
- Team: Vietnam National Jujitsu Team / Hanoi Team
- Years active: 2014–present

Other information
- Occupation: Athlete, martial artist

Đào Hồng Sơn (born 29 December 1997) is a Vietnamese professional martial artist and athlete specializing in jujitsu. He won the World Beach Jujitsu Championship in 2022, the Ju-Jitsu Asian Championship in 2025, and clinched a gold medal at the World Ju-jitsu Contact Championship in 2026. Additionally, he is a two-time Southeast Asian Games gold medalist, winning consecutive titles at SEA Games 31 and the SEA Games 32. For his outstanding contributions to the nation's sports achievements, he was awarded the first-class and second-class Labour Order by the State of the Socialist Republic of Vietnam.

== Sports career ==
Đào Hồng Sơn was born and raised in Triều Khúc village, Tân Triều commune, Thanh Trì (now part of Thanh Liệt Ward, Thanh Xuân district), Hanoi. This land is rich in cultural traditions and particularly famous for the Trieu Khuc village wrestling festival held every early spring. Even as an 11-year-old boy, Son showed a deep passion for physical sports and began competing at the village wrestling ring, winning third prize in his very first appearance.

Sports scouts of the capital selected him for development. However, instead of choosing freestyle wrestling, Dao Hong Son started his professional sports career training in Judo at the Hanoi Sports Training and Competition Center.

=== Judo career (2014–2020) ===
In 2014, at the age of 17, Hồng Sơn entered domestic tournaments. At the National Youth Judo Championship 2014, he won a bronze medal in the lightweight division. Following this momentum, at the elite national level event—the National Judo Cup 2014, he went on to secure a silver medal for the Hanoi delegation.

In 2015, he maintained his form by winning another bronze medal at the national youth tournament, and subsequently earned consecutive bronze medals at the National Judo Championships in 2016, 2017, 2019, and 2020.

=== Domestic Jujitsu career ===
From 2019 to 2025, Hồng Sơn established absolute dominance in the domestic arena, winning consecutive gold medals at all National Jujitsu Championships and National Club Championships in the men's 56 kg division. At the 9th National Games of Vietnam in 2022, he remained undefeated and brought home a prestigious gold medal for Hanoi. In international arenas, Dao Hong Son won a silver medal at the Asian Beach Championship in the No-Gi format in 2016, a gold medal at the Asian Championship in 2017, along with a bronze medal at the World Jujitsu Championship in 2017, and back-to-back gold medals at the Southeast Asian level during 2018–2019.

At the mixed martial arts tournament MMA Lion Championship 14, Hồng Sơn took only 17 seconds to defeat his opponent Phạm Ngọc Cảnh using a fly armbar submission. This 17-second victory set a new record for the fastest finish in the history of the promotion.

=== Southeast Asian Games ===
==== SEA Games 30 ====
At the SEA Games 30 held in the Philippines in 2019, Hồng Sơn claimed a bronze medal in the jujitsu Ne-Waza Gi men's 56 kg division.

==== SEA Games 31 ====
At the SEA Games 31 hosted in Vietnam in May 2022, the jujitsu tournament took place at Đan Phượng District Gymnasium, Hanoi. Before the competition opened, Dao Hong Son suffered a severe injury crisis in November 2021, which heavily disrupted his training schedule. Despite the setback, Hồng Sơn put on a convincing performance to capture his first career SEA Games gold medal, asserting his position as the number one athlete in Southeast Asia in the Ne-Waza Nogi 56 kg division.

==== SEA Games 32 ====
At the SEA Games 32 held in Phnom Penh, Cambodia in 2023, Hồng Sơn successfully defended his SEA Games gold medal. This was also the solitary gold medal earned by the Vietnam National Jujitsu Team at that year's Games in Cambodia.

==== SEA Games 33 ====
At the SEA Games 33 in Thailand in late 2025, Hồng Sơn claimed a bronze medal in the Men's Fighting 62 kg category.

=== International world tournaments ===
Expanding beyond the regional Southeast Asian stage, Hồng Sơn continuously secured podium finishes across global platforms:

- In 2016, he participated in the Asian Beach Jujitsu Championship and captured a silver medal in the Ne-Waza Nogi 56 kg division.
- In 2017, he entered the Ju-Jitsu World Championship held in Greece and won a bronze medal in the Ju-jitsu 56 kg class. Concurrently, at the 2017 Asian Indoor and Martial Arts Games, he put on an excellent performance to secure a bronze medal in the Ju-jitsu Full Contact 62 kg division.
- In 2022, he participated in the World Beach Ju-Jitsu Cup held in Thailand and successfully won the gold medal in the Ne-Waza Nogi 56 kg class. In the same year, at the indoor system World Championship held in the UAE, he brought home another valuable bronze medal.
- In 2024, he took part in the Ju-Jitsu Asian Championship in the UAE, competing in the No Gi 56 kg class and finished with a silver medal.
- In 2025, at the Southeast Asian Ju-Jitsu Championship in the Philippines, Hồng Sơn achieved a hat-trick of victories, claiming three gold medals in the No-Gi, Fighting, and Full Contact 56 kg divisions. In May of the same year, immediately after completing a series of spring village wrestling festivals at his hometown, Hồng Sơn traveled to Jordan to compete in the 2025 Ju-Jitsu Asian Championship. He competed in the Men's Full Contact 56 kg category and successfully crowned himself the Asian champion. Later in November 2025, at the JJIF World Ju-Jitsu Championship 2025 in Jordan, Hồng Sơn claimed a double gold world title, including an absolute victory in the Men's HIF Ju-Jitsu 56 kg discipline, pushing the Vietnamese delegation to third place in the overall medal table.
- In 2026, Hồng Sơn was one of ten prominent fighters selected for the national team to feature at the World Contact Ju-Jitsu Championship. He outstandingly secured the gold medal at the World Ju-Jitsu Contact Championship 2026.

== Career records ==
=== International ===
Year	Tournament	Venue	Content / Weight class	Result
2026	World Contact Ju-Jitsu Championship	Turkey	Ju-jitsu Full Contact / 56 kg	1st place, gold medalist(s)
2025	Ju-Jitsu World Championship	Thailand	HIF Fighting / 56 kg	1st place, gold medalist(s)
2025	Ju-Jitsu World Championship	Thailand	Ju-jitsu Full Contact / 56 kg	1st place, gold medalist(s)
2025	Ju-Jitsu Asian Championship	Jordan	Ju-Jitsu Full Contact / 56 kg	1st place, gold medalist(s)
2025	SEA Games 33	Thailand	Ju-Jitsu Fighting / 62 kg	3rd place, bronze medalist(s)
2025	Southeast Asian Ju-Jitsu Championship	Philippines	Fighting / 56 kg	1st place, gold medalist(s)
2025	Southeast Asian Ju-Jitsu Championship	Philippines	Ju-jitsu Full Contact / 56 kg	1st place, gold medalist(s)
2025	Southeast Asian Ju-Jitsu Championship	Philippines	Ne-Waza No Gi / 56 kg	1st place, gold medalist(s)
2024	Ju-Jitsu Asian Championship	United Arab Emirates	No Gi / 56 kg	2nd place, silver medalist(s)
2023	SEA Games 32	Cambodia	Ne-Waza Nogi / 56 kg	1st place, gold medalist(s)
2022	World Beach Ju-Jitsu Cup	Thailand	Ne-Waza Nogi / 56 kg	1st place, gold medalist(s)
2022	Ju-Jitsu World Championship	United Arab Emirates	Ne-Waza Nogi / 56 kg	3rd place, bronze medalist(s)
2022	SEA Games 31	Vietnam	Ne-Waza Nogi / 56 kg	1st place, gold medalist(s)
2021	Asian Beach Ju-Jitsu Championship	Thailand	Ne-Waza / 56 kg	1st place, gold medalist(s)
2021	Ju-Jitsu Asian Championship	Jordan	Ne-Waza / 56 kg	3rd place, bronze medalist(s)
2019	SEA Games 30	Philippines	Ju-jitsu Ne-Waza Gi / 56 kg	3rd place, bronze medalist(s)
2017	Ju-Jitsu World Championship	Greece	Ju-jitsu Ne-Waza Gi / 56 kg	3rd place, bronze medalist(s)
2017	Asian Indoor and Martial Arts Games	Turkmenistan	Ju-jitsu Full Contact / 62 kg	3rd place, bronze medalist(s)
2016	Asian Beach Ju-Jitsu Championship	Sri Lanka	Ne-Waza Nogi / 56 kg	2nd place, silver medalist(s)

== Honors and awards ==
In recognition of his tremendous contributions to the country's athletic achievements, the State of the Socialist Republic of Vietnam honored him with the Labour Order Second Class in 2025 and the Labour Order First Class in 2026.

== See also ==
- Jujitsu
- 2017 Asian Indoor and Martial Arts Games
- SEA Games 31
- Nguyen Thi Anh Vien
