= Bangladesh men's national indoor hockey team =

Bangladesh
- Association: Bangladesh Hockey Federation
- Confederation: AHF (Asia)
- Head Coach: Hamidrezq Kashi Bokharaie
- Manager: Naser Jamil
- Captain: Farhad Ahmed Shetul

FIH ranking
- Current: 39 (16 May 2024)

First international
- Malaysia 6–0 Bangladesh (Chonburi, Thailand; 15 July 2019)

Biggest win
- Bangladesh 9–0 Philippines (Chonburi, Thailand; 17 July 2019); Bangladesh 9–0 Chinese Taipei (Chonburi, Thailand; 20 July 2019)

Biggest defeat
- Iran 8–0 Bangladesh (Chonburi, Thailand; 16 July 2019)

Men's Indoor Hockey Asia Cup
- Appearances: DNQ

Men's Indoor Hockey Asia Cup
- Appearances: 1 (first in 2019)
- Best result: 7th (2019)

The Bangladesh men's national indoor hockey team represents Bangladesh in men's international Indoor hockey and is controlled by the Bangladesh Hockey Federation. The team participate in the Men's Indoor Hockey Asia Cup.

== History ==
Bangladesh men's national indoor hockey team have played their debut game against Malaysia on 15 July 2019 at Indoor Stadium Huamark Chonburi, Thailand which lost by 6–0 goals. The team participate once in the 2019 Men's Indoor Hockey Asia Cup which they have finished by seventh place of ten participants. The nation yet to qualify in the Men's Indoor Hockey World Cup.

== Home stadium ==
The Bangladesh men's national indoor hockey team played their home games at Shaheed Suhrawardi Indoor Stadium Mirpur, Dhaka, Bangladesh.

== Current squad ==
The following squad were announced for 2019 Men's Indoor Hockey Asia Cup.

As of 22 June 2024

Jersey No	Name	Position	Most Recent Call-up
1	Asim Gope	GK	2019 Men's Indoor Hockey Asia Cup
2	Md Khorshadur Rahman	FW	2019 Men's Indoor Hockey Asia Cup
3	Farhad Ahmed Shetul	DF/Captain	2019 Men's Indoor Hockey Asia Cup
4	Ashraful Islam	DF	2019 Men's Indoor Hockey Asia Cup
5	Md Imran Hasan	DF	2019 Men's Indoor Hockey Asia Cup
6	Mohd Imran Sarkar	FW	2019 Men's Indoor Hockey Asia Cup
7	Rashel Mahmud	FW	2019 Men's Indoor Hockey Asia Cup
8	Md Sarower Hossain	FW	2019 Men's Indoor Hockey Asia Cup
9	Md Milon Hossain	FW	2019 Men's Indoor Hockey Asia Cup
10	Mainul Islam	MF	2019 Men's Indoor Hockey Asia Cup
11	Fazla Rabby	MF	2019 Men's Indoor Hockey Asia Cup
12	Abu Nippon	GK	2019 Men's Indoor Hockey Asia Cup

== Results and fixtures ==
Legend

Win Draw Lose Fixture

=== 2019 ===
15 July 2019 2019 Men's Indoor Hockey Asia Cup Pool stages	Malaysia	6–0	Bangladesh	Chonburi, Thailand
10:20 BST (UTC+6)	Yaacob 2', 20+'; Faridzul 5', 37'; Silverius 15'; Omar 39'	Report		Stadium: Indoor Stadium Huamark

16 July 2019 2019 Men's Indoor Hockey Asia Cup Pool stages	Iran	8–0	Bangladesh	Chonburi, Thailand
13:00 BST (UTC+6)	Nooranian 1', 3'; Norouzzadeh 5', 22', 39'; Mirzakhanian 16'; Taherirad 30'; Beiranvand 40+'	Report		Stadium: Indoor Stadium Huamark

17 July 2019 2019 Men's Indoor Hockey Asia Cup Pool stages	Philippines	0–9	Bangladesh	Chonburi, Thailand
9:00 BST (UTC+6)		Report	M. Islam 4', 5', 11', 20', 30', 36'; A. Islam 9'; Mahmud 17', 33'	Stadium: Indoor Stadium Huamark

18 July 2019 2019 Men's Indoor Hockey Asia Cup Pool stages	Bangladesh	1–3	Thailand	Chonburi, Thailand
19:00 BST (UTC+6)	M. Islam 36'	Report	Boonpea 3'; Kampanthong 6', 34'	Stadium: Indoor Stadium Huamark

20 July 2019 2019 Men's Indoor Hockey Asia Cup 7th-place match	Bangladesh	9–0	Chinese Taipei	Chonburi, Thailand
13:00 BST (UTC+6)	A. Islam 5', 18'; M.M. Hossain 15', 20'; Mahmud 20'; Shetul 26', 32'; M. Islam 28'; Rahman 33'	Report		Stadium: Indoor Stadium Huamark

== Competitive records ==
=== Men's Indoor Hockey World Cup ===
Men's Indoor Hockey World Cup records
Year	Round	Position	GP	W	D	L	GS	GA
(Germany) 2003	Did not participate							
(Austria) 2007	Did not participate							
(Poland) 2011	Did not participate							
(Germany) 2015	Did not participate							
(Germany) 2018	Did not participate							
(Belgium) 2022	Did not participate							
(South Africa) 2023	Did not participate							
(Croatia) 2025	To be determined							
Total	Best results	0/8	0	0	0	0	0	0

=== Men's Indoor Hockey Asia Cup ===
Men's Indoor Hockey Asia Cup records
Year	Round	Position	GP	W	D	L	GS	GA
(Malaysia) 2008	Did not participate							
(Malaysia) 2009	Did not participate							
(Malaysia) 2010	Did not participate							
(Thailand) 2012	Did not participate							
(Taiwan) 2014	Did not participate							
(Kazakhstan) 2015	Did not participate							
(Qatar) 2017	Did not participate							
(Thailand) 2019	Preliminary-round	7th-place	5	1	0	4	19	17
(Thailand) 2022	Did not participate							
(Kazakhstan) 2024	Did not participate							
Total	Best results	1/10	5	1	0	4	19	17

== Head-to-head record ==
As of 22 June 2024

Opponents	Region	P	W	D	L	GF	GA	GD	%Win
Malaysia	AFC	1	0	0	1	0	6	−6	0.00
Iran	AFC	1	0	0	1	0	8	−8	0.00
Philippines	AFC	1	1	0	0	9	0	+9	100.00
Thailand	AFC	1	0	0	1	1	3	−2	0.00
Chinese Taipei	AFC	1	1	0	0	9	0	+9	100.00
Total	5 Nations	5	2	0	3	10	17	–7	

== See also ==
- Bangladesh women's national field hockey team
- Bangladesh men's national field hockey team
- Bangladesh women's national under-21 field hockey team
- Bangladesh men's national under-21 field hockey team
