= Indoor hockey at the SEA Games =

Indoor hockey at the Southeast Asian Games
- Current season, competition or edition: Indoor hockey at the 2025 SEA Games
- Sport: Indoor hockey
- Founded: 2017; 9 years ago
- First season: 2017
- No. of teams: 6
- Confederation: AHF (Southeast Asia)
- Most recent champions: M: Indonesia (2nd title); W: Thailand (3rd title) (2025)
- Most titles: M: Malaysia, Indonesia (2 titles); W: Thailand (3 titles)

Indoor hockey at the Southeast Asian Games was first introduced at the 2017 Southeast Asian Games in Kuala Lumpur, Malaysia.

Malaysia won the first men's tournament and Thailand the first women's tournament. Indonesia won the men's tournament in two consecutive editions.

== Men's tournament ==
=== Results ===
Year	Host	Final			Bronze medal match			Number of teams
Year	Host	Gold medal	Score	Silver medal	Bronze medal	Score	Fourth place	Number of teams
2017; Details	Kuala Lumpur, Malaysia	Malaysia	5–1	Indonesia	Singapore	1–1 (3–1 s.o.)	Thailand	6
2019; Details	Laguna, Philippines	Malaysia	3–1	Thailand	Myanmar Singapore	No playoff		5
2023; Details	Phnom Penh, Cambodia	Indonesia	3–3 (2–1 s.o.)	Malaysia	Thailand Singapore	No playoff		6
2025; Details	Bangkok, Thailand	Indonesia	4-4 (2–0 s.o.)	Malaysia	Thailand Singapore	No playoff		5

* = hosts

=== Summary ===
Team	Gold medal	Silver medal	Bronze medal	Fourth place
Malaysia	2 (2017*, 2019)	2 (2023, 2025)		
Indonesia	2 (2023, 2025)	1 (2017)		
Thailand		1 (2019)	2 (2023, 2025)	1 (2017)
Singapore			4 (2017, 2019, 2023, 2025)	
Myanmar			1 (2019)	

* = hosts

=== Team appearances ===
Team	(Malaysia) 2017	(Philippines) 2019	(Cambodia) 2023	(Thailand) 2025	Years
Cambodia	–	–	5th	–	1
Indonesia	2nd	–	1st	1st	3
Malaysia	1st	1st	2nd	2nd	4
Myanmar	–	3rd	–	–	1
Philippines	6th	5th	6th	Q	4
Singapore	3rd	3rd	3rd	3rd	4
Thailand	4th	2nd	3rd	3rd	4
Vietnam	5th	–	–	–	1
Total	6	5	6	5	

== Women's tournament ==
=== Results ===
Year	Host	Final			Bronze medal match			Number of teams
Year	Host	Gold medal	Score	Silver medal	Bronze medal	Score	Fourth place	Number of teams
2017; Details	Kuala Lumpur, Malaysia	Thailand	4–1	Indonesia	Malaysia	3–1	Singapore	5
2019; Details	Laguna, Philippines	Malaysia	1–1 (2–0 s.o.)	Thailand	Philippines Singapore	No playoff		5
2023; Details	Phnom Penh, Cambodia	Thailand	0–0 (2–1 s.o.)	Malaysia	Indonesia Cambodia	No playoff		6
2025; Details	Bangkok, Thailand	Thailand	4–3	Malaysia	Indonesia Singapore	No playoff		5

=== Summary ===
Team	Gold medal	Silver medal	Bronze medal	Fourth place
Thailand	3 (2017, 2023, 2025)	1 (2019)		
Malaysia	1 (2019)	1 (2023, 2025)	1 (2017*)	
Indonesia		1 (2017)	2 (2023, 2025)	
Singapore			2 (2019, 2025)	1 (2017)
Philippines			1 (2019*)	
Cambodia			1 (2023*)	

* = hosts

=== Team appearances ===
Team	(Malaysia) 2017	(Philippines) 2019	(Cambodia) 2023	(Thailand) 2025	Years
Cambodia	–	5th	3rd	–	2
Indonesia	2nd	–	3rd	3rd	3
Malaysia	3rd	1st	2nd	2nd	4
Philippines	5th	3rd	6th	Q	4
Singapore	4th	3rd	5th	3rd	4
Thailand	1st	2nd	1st	1st	4
Total	5	5	6	5	

== Medal table ==
=== Total ===
Rank	Nation	Gold	Silver	Bronze	Total
1	Malaysia (MAS)	3	4	1	8
2	Thailand (THA)	3	2	2	7
3	Indonesia (INA)	2	2	2	6
4	Singapore (SGP)	0	0	5	5
5	Cambodia (CAM)	0	0	1	1
5	Myanmar (MYA)	0	0	1	1
5	Philippines (PHI)	0	0	1	1
Totals (7 entries)		8	8	13	29

=== Men ===
Rank	Nation	Gold	Silver	Bronze	Total
1	Malaysia	2	2	0	4
2	Indonesia	2	1	0	3
3	Thailand	0	1	2	3
4	Singapore	0	0	4	4
5	Myanmar	0	0	1	1
Totals (5 entries)		4	4	7	15

=== Women ===
Rank	Nation	Gold	Silver	Bronze	Total
1	Thailand	3	1	0	4
2	Malaysia	1	2	1	4
3	Indonesia	0	1	2	3
4	Singapore	0	0	2	2
5	Cambodia	0	0	1	1
5	Philippines	0	0	1	1
Totals (6 entries)		4	4	7	15

== See also ==
- Ice hockey at the SEA Games
