= 2024 Women's Indoor Hockey Asia Cup =

Tournament details
- Host country: Thailand
- City: Chonburi
- Dates: 13–16 May
- Teams: 9 (from 1 confederation)
- Venue: Thailand National Sport University

Final positions
- Champions: Thailand (2nd title)
- Runner-up: Kazakhstan
- Third place: Malaysia

Tournament statistics
- Matches played: 23
- Goals scored: 193 (8.39 per match)
- Top scorer(s): (Kazakhstan) Viktoriya Lobanova (Kazakhstan) Viktoriya Lyapina (16 goals)
- Best player: (Kazakhstan) Viktoriya Lobanova
- Best young player: (Thailand) Jiratchaya Todkaew
- Best goalkeeper: (Malaysia) Farah Yahya

The 2024 Women's Indoor Hockey Asia Cup was the ninth edition of the Women's Indoor Hockey Asia Cup, the biennial international women's indoor hockey championship of Asia organized by the Asian Hockey Federation.

It was held at the Thailand National Sport University in Chonburi, Thailand from 13 to 16 May 2024.

The hosts and defending champions Thailand won their second title by defeating Kazakhstan 6–2 in the final. Malaysia won the bronze medal by defeating Indonesia 4–0. As winners, Thailand qualified for the 2025 Women's FIH Indoor Hockey World Cup.

== Teams ==
The following nine teams participated in the tournament, Nepal withdrew before the start of the tournament.

Team	FIH Indoor World Rankings	Appearance	Last Appearance	Previous best performance
Cambodia	42	3rd	2022	5th (2015)
Indonesia	18	2nd	2022	2nd (2022)
Iran	38	4th	2022	4th (2009)
Kazakhstan	13	8th	2022	1st (2010, 2012, 2014, 2015, 2017, 2019)
Malaysia	36	7th	2022	1st (2009)
Oman	Not ranked	1st	none	debut
Singapore	40	2nd	2022	7th (2022)
Thailand	17	7th	2022	1st (2022)
Vietnam	Not ranked	1st	none	debut

== Preliminary round ==
All times are local (UTC+7).

=== Pool A ===
Pos	Team	Pld	W	D	L	GF	GA	GD	Pts	Qualification
1	Kazakhstan	4	4	0	0	46	2	+44	12	Semi-finals
2	Malaysia	4	3	0	1	42	8	+34	9	Semi-finals
3	Iran	4	2	0	2	29	9	+20	6	Fifth place match
4	Oman	4	1	0	3	2	28	−26	3	Seventh place match
5	Vietnam	4	0	0	4	0	72	−72	0	Ninth place match

Source: FIH
Rules for classification: 1) points; 2) matches won; 3) goal difference; 4) goals for; 5) head-to-head result; 6) field goals for.

13 May 2024
10:00

Malaysia	25–0	Vietnam
	Report

13 May 2024
11:15

Iran	8–0	Oman
	Report

13 May 2024
17:30

Kazakhstan	28–0	Vietnam
	Report

13 May 2024
18:45

Malaysia	12–1	Oman
	Report

14 May 2024
10:00

Vietnam	0–18	Iran
	Report

14 May 2024
11:15

Malaysia	1–5	Kazakhstan
	Report

14 May 2024
17:30

Iran	2–4	Malaysia
	Report

14 May 2024
18:45

Kazakhstan	8–0	Oman
	Report

15 May 2024
11:15

Oman	1–0	Vietnam
	Report

15 May 2024
13:45

Iran	1–5	Kazakhstan
	Report

=== Pool B ===
Pos	Team	Pld	W	D	L	GF	GA	GD	Pts	Qualification
1	Thailand (H)	3	3	0	0	20	2	+18	9	Semi-finals
2	Indonesia	3	2	0	1	7	10	−3	6	Semi-finals
3	Cambodia	3	1	0	2	4	9	−5	3	Fifth place match
4	Singapore	3	0	0	3	1	11	−10	0	Seventh place match

Source: FIH
Rules for classification: 1) points; 2) matches won; 3) goal difference; 4) goals for; 5) head-to-head result; 6) field goals for.
(H) Hosts

13 May 2024
12:30

Indonesia	4–2	Cambodia
	Report

13 May 2024
20:00

Thailand	8–0	Singapore
	Report

14 May 2024
12:30

Singapore	0–1	Cambodia
	Report

14 May 2024
20:00

Indonesia	1–7	Thailand
	Report

15 May 2024
10:00

Singapore	1–2	Indonesia
	Report

15 May 2024
12:30

Thailand	5–1	Cambodia
	Report

== Fifth to ninth place classification ==
=== Seventh and ninth place ===
15 May 2024
17:15

Singapore	15–0	Vietnam
Lim 3', 7', 11'; Abdull 5', 10', 19', 35'; Ibrahim 13'; Toh 16', 22', 32', 37'; Lam 21', 32'; Chua 39'	Report

Umpires:
Hazatul Abd Razak (MAS)
Zarina Ilyassova (KAZ)

=== Seventh and eighth place ===
16 May 2024
15:30

Oman	1–3	Singapore
Al-Balushi 32'	Report	Toh 24', 39'; Ibrahim 29'

Umpires:
Hazatul Abd Razak (MAS)
Jureporn Oimmak (THA)

=== Fifth and sixth place ===
16 May 2024
17:00

Iran	1–1	Cambodia
Yahyavi 25'	Report	Mam 26'
Penalties
Poupash (penalty shoot-out scored); Abbasi (penalty shoot-out missed); Yahyavi (penalty shoot-out scored)	2–0	(penalty shoot-out missed) Duch; (penalty shoot-out missed) Vun

Umpires:
Tita Sari (INA)
Donald White (VIE)

== First to fourth place classification ==
=== Bracket ===
Semi-finals
15 May
Kazakhstan (p.s.o.)	3 (2)
Indonesia	3 (1)
15 May
Thailand	2
Malaysia	1

Final
16 May
Kazakhstan	2
Thailand	6
Third place
16 May
Indonesia	0
Malaysia	4

=== Semi-finals ===
15 May 2024
18:45

Kazakhstan	3–3	Indonesia
Lyapina 1', 14'; Lobanova 20'	Report	Patmawati 9'; Anisa 12'; Sugiarti 40'
Penalties
Lyapina (penalty shoot-out missed); Lobanova (penalty shoot-out scored); Beisenbay (penalty shoot-out missed); Beisenbay (penalty shoot-out scored)	2–1	(penalty shoot-out scored) Wardani; (penalty shoot-out missed) Purbasari; (penalty shoot-out missed) Sugiarti; (penalty shoot-out missed) Wardani

Umpires:
Ornpimol Kittiteerasopon (THA)
Rahimah Aziz (SGP)

15 May 2024
20:15

Thailand	2–1	Malaysia
Todkaew 7'; Sakulpithak 27'	Report	Mohamad 32'

Umpires:
Kristy Robertson (AUS)
Micaela Roos (RSA)

=== Third and fourth place ===
16 May 2024
18:30

Indonesia	0–4	Malaysia
	Report	Sylvester 3', 26'; Ellias 13'; Din 34'

Umpires:
Ornpimol Kittiteerasopon (THA)
Rahimah Aziz (SGP)

=== Final ===
16 May 2024
20:00

Kazakhstan	2–6	Thailand
Bissirova 15'; Khairusheva 37'	Report	Sakulpithak 9', 16'; Duangwao 14', 30'; Todkaew 23', 27'

Umpires:
Kristy Robertson (AUS)
Micaela Roos (RSA)

== Final standings ==
Pos	Team	Qualification
1st place, gold medalist(s)	Thailand (H)	2025 Indoor World Cup
2nd place, silver medalist(s)	Kazakhstan	
3rd place, bronze medalist(s)	Malaysia	
4	Indonesia	
5	Iran	
6	Cambodia	
7	Singapore	
8	Oman	
9	Vietnam	

Source: FIH
(H) Host

== See also ==
- 2024 Men's Indoor Hockey Asia Cup
- 2025 Women's Hockey Asia Cup
