= Indoor hockey at the 2019 SEA Games =

- Venue: LB Centro Mall & Convention Center
- Location: Los Banos, Laguna
- Date: 4–10 December
- Competitors: 120 from 6 nations

Champions
- Men: Malaysia
- Women: Malaysia

The indoor hockey competitions at the 2019 SEA Games in the Philippines were held at the LB Centro Mall & Convention Center in Los Banos, Laguna from 4 to 10 December 2019. There were competitions in two events (one event for each gender).

Indonesia had arrived with the intention of participating both their Men's and Women's Team. However, due to conflict back home with officiating clubs and the organization the FIH disallowed their participation. They had left a few days after this forced withdrawal of participation.

== Participation ==
=== Participating nations ===
- Cambodia (12)
- Malaysia (24)
- Myanmar (12)
- Philippines (24)
- Singapore (24)
- Thailand (24)

== Men's tournament ==
=== Group stage ===
Pos	Team	Pld	W	D	L	GF	GA	GD	Pts	Qualification
1	Malaysia	4	4	0	0	19	0	+19	12	Semi-finals
2	Thailand	4	2	1	1	10	4	+6	7	Semi-finals
3	Singapore	4	2	1	1	8	10	−2	7	Semi-finals
4	Myanmar	4	1	0	3	6	14	−8	3	Semi-finals
5	Philippines (H)	4	0	0	4	2	17	−15	0	

Source: FIH
(H) Hosts

=== Medal round ===
Semi-finals
9 December
Thailand	5
Singapore	1
9 December
Malaysia	7
Myanmar	0

Final
10 December
Thailand	1
Malaysia	3

=== Final standings ===
Rank	Team
1st place, gold medalist(s)	Malaysia
2nd place, silver medalist(s)	Thailand
3rd place, bronze medalist(s)	Myanmar
3rd place, bronze medalist(s)	Singapore
5	Philippines

== Women's tournament ==
=== Group stage ===
Pos	Team	Pld	W	D	L	GF	GA	GD	Pts	Qualification
1	Malaysia	4	3	1	0	30	2	+28	10	Semi-finals
2	Thailand	4	3	1	0	23	3	+20	10	Semi-finals
3	Singapore	4	1	1	2	4	16	−12	4	Semi-finals
4	Philippines (H)	4	1	0	3	4	24	−20	3	Semi-finals
5	Cambodia	4	0	1	3	7	23	−16	1	

Source: FIH
(H) Hosts

=== Medal round ===
Semi-finals
9 December
Thailand	4
Singapore	0
9 December
Malaysia	16
Philippines	0

Final
10 December
Thailand	1 (0)
Malaysia (s.o.)	1 (2)

=== Final standings ===
Rank	Team
1st place, gold medalist(s)	Malaysia
2nd place, silver medalist(s)	Thailand
3rd place, bronze medalist(s)	Philippines
3rd place, bronze medalist(s)	Singapore
5	Cambodia

== Medal summary ==
=== Medal table ===
* Host nation (Philippines)

Rank	Nation	Gold	Silver	Bronze	Total
1	Malaysia (MAS)	2	0	0	2
2	Thailand (THA)	0	2	0	2
3	Singapore (SGP)	0	0	2	2
4	Myanmar (MYA)	0	0	1	1
4	Philippines (PHI)*	0	0	1	1
Totals (5 entries)		2	2	4	8

=== Medalists ===
Event	Gold	Silver	Bronze
Men's tournament	Malaysia	Thailand	Myanmar
Men's tournament	Malaysia	Thailand	Singapore
Women's tournament	Malaysia	Thailand	Philippines
Women's tournament	Malaysia	Thailand	Singapore
