= Indoor Hockey Asia Cup =

Indoor Hockey Asia Cup may refer to:

- Men's Indoor Hockey Asia Cup
- Women's Indoor Hockey Asia Cup
