= 2024 Men's Indoor Hockey Asia Cup =

Tournament details
- Host country: Kazakhstan
- City: Taldykorgan
- Dates: 21–25 May
- Teams: 8 (from 1 confederation)

Final positions
- Champions: Iran (9th title)
- Runner-up: Malaysia
- Third place: Kazakhstan

Tournament statistics
- Matches played: 24
- Goals scored: 259 (10.79 per match)
- Top scorer(s): (Iran) Amirmahdi Mirzakhani (24 goals)
- Best player: (Iran) Amirmahdi Mirzakhani
- Best young player: (Kazakhstan) Agymta Duisengazy
- Best goalkeeper: (Malaysia) Khairul Kamaruzaman

The 2024 Men's Indoor Hockey Asia Cup was the tenth edition of the Men's Indoor Hockey Asia Cup, the biennial international men's indoor hockey championship of Asia organized by the Asian Hockey Federation. The tournament was held from 21 to 25 May 2024 in Taldykorgan, Kazakhstan.

Iran won the tournament for a record ninth time after defeating the defending champions Malaysia 7–1 in the final. As finalists Iran and Malaysia qualified for the 2025 Men's FIH Indoor Hockey World Cup. The hosts Kazakhstan won the bronze medal by defeating Thailand 7–2.

== Teams ==
The following eight teams participated in the tournament:

Team	Appearance	Last appearance	Previous best performance
Indonesia	3rd	2022	4th (2022)
Iran	10th	2022	1st (2008, 2009, 2010, 2012, 2014, 2015, 2017, 2019)
Kazakhstan	8th	2022	2nd (2015, 2017, 2019)
Malaysia	9th	2022	1st (2022)
Oman	2nd	2017	6th (2017)
Singapore	4th	2022	5th (2008)
Tajikistan	2nd	2015	5th (2015)
Thailand	8th	2022	4th (2012)

== Preliminary round ==
All times are local UTC+05:00 (West / East).

=== Pool A ===
Pos	Team	Pld	W	D	L	GF	GA	GD	Pts	Qualification
1	Iran	3	3	0	0	55	4	+51	9	First to fourth place classification
2	Thailand	3	2	0	1	27	13	+14	6	First to fourth place classification
3	Singapore	3	1	0	2	17	14	+3	3	Fifth to eighth place classification
4	Tajikistan	3	0	0	3	3	71	−68	0	Fifth to eighth place classification

Source: FIH
Rules for classification: 1) points; 2) matches won; 3) goal difference; 4) goals for; 5) head-to-head result; 6) field goals for.

21 May 2024
10:30

Iran	8–0	Singapore
Shahrokhi 9', 22', 25'; Nooranian 12'; Mamizadeh 15', 40'; Bohlouli 17'; Mirzakhani 33'	Report	Asozoda 17'

Umpires:
Raman Baskar (MAS)
Daulet Urmanov (KAZ)

21 May 2024
11:45

Thailand	19–1	Tajikistan
A-Nukoon 1', 3', 14', 18', 26', 31'; Boonpea 2', 10', 19'; Samoang 5', 15', 40'; Suyaram 9'; Sori 24', 37'; Ketsawad 25'; Sukwong 34'; Yuphet 35', 38'	Report

Umpires:
Salman (INA)
Ahmed Al Hassani (OMA)

21 May 2024
16:30

Singapore	15–2	Tajikistan
Murid 3', 7', 12', 39'; Ng 4', 13', 25', 35'; Wong 7', 37'; Mat Rahim 10', 10+', 24'; Watanabe 16'; Haq 31'	Report	Ghulomov 1'; Alizoda 33'

Umpires:
Salman (INA)
Daulet Urmanov (KAZ)

21 May 2024
17:45

Thailand	4–10	Iran
Sori 5'; Suyaram 32'; Sukwong 33'; Yuphet 36'	Report	Asnaashari 2'; Nooranian 9', 29'; Yamani 10', 24'; Lashgari 15'; Mirzakhani 18', 23'; Mamizadeh 31'; Shahrokhi 39'

Umpires:
Raman Baskar (MAS)
Ahmed Al Hassani (OMA)

22 May 2024
14:00

Iran	37–0	Tajikistan
Nooranian 1'; Mamizadeh 2', 18'; Mirzakhani 4', 4', 5', 11', 12', 13', 17', 20', 24', 26', 28'; Asnaashari 13'; Yamani 14', 16', 21', 25', 29', 34'; Shahrokhi 15', 27', 30', 37', 40'; Hamedi 17', 39'; Mohammadi 19'; Lashgari 23', 25', 36'	Report

Umpires:
Raman Baskar (MAS)
Ahmed Al Hassani (OMA)

22 May 2024
16:30

Singapore	2–4	Thailand
Mat Rahim 10'; Murid 12'	Report	Suyaram 5'; Sori 7'; Boonpea 13', 22'

Umpires:
Salman (INA)
Daulet Urmanov (KAZ)

=== Pool B ===
Pos	Team	Pld	W	D	L	GF	GA	GD	Pts	Qualification
1	Malaysia	3	2	1	0	18	9	+9	7	First to fourth place classification
2	Kazakhstan (H)	3	2	1	0	13	5	+8	7	First to fourth place classification
3	Indonesia	3	1	0	2	14	12	+2	3	Fifth to eighth place classification
4	Oman	3	0	0	3	3	22	−19	0	Fifth to eighth place classification

Source: FIH
Rules for classification: 1) points; 2) matches won; 3) goal difference; 4) goals for; 5) head-to-head result; 6) field goals for.
(H) Hosts

21 May 2024
13:00

Malaysia	10–2	Oman
Jazlan 3', 24', 31'; Hamirin 12', 34'; Azhar 17'; Mohd Zain 19', 27'; Hamsani 25'; Mohd 33'	Report	Barazahan 18'; Al-Fazari 37'

Umpires:
Zeke Newman (AUS)
Sean Goh (SGP)

21 May 2024
19:00

Kazakhstan	6–2	Indonesia
Dyussebekov 1', 10'; Yelubayev 24', 25', 29'; Aitkaliyev 38'	Report	Jodie 27'; Priliandro 36'

Umpires:
Zeke Newman (AUS)
Shigeki Kodama (JPN)

22 May 2024
11:30

Indonesia	8–1	Oman
Prawesti 8'; Santoso 13', 20', 37'; Leksono 14'; Asasi 27'; Alfiana 30'; Priliandro 31'	Report	Al-Fazari 12'

Umpires:
Shigeki Kodama (JPN)
Sean Goh (SGP)

22 May 2024
12:45

Malaysia	3–3	Kazakhstan
Mohd 15'; Jazlan 38', 39'	Report	Tashkeyev 2', 17'; Duisengazy 34'

Umpires:
Zeke Newman (AUS)
Naser Samadi (IRI)

22 May 2024
17:45

Indonesia	4–5	Malaysia
Priliandro 24'; Alfiana 31', 32'; Leksono 37'	Report	Jazlan 4', 29'; Omar 9'; Hanafiah 20'; Mohd 35'

Umpires:
Zeke Newman (AUS)
Naser Samadi (IRI)

22 May 2024
19:00

Kazakhstan	4–0	Oman
Tashkeyev 14'; Duisengazy 19'; Dyussebekov 23'; Yelubayev 35'	Report

Umpires:
Shigeki Kodama (JPN)
Sean Goh (SGP)

== Fifth to eighth place classification ==
=== Pool D ===
Pos	Team	Pld	W	D	L	GF	GA	GD	Pts	Qualification
1	Indonesia	3	3	0	0	30	2	+28	9	Fifth place match
2	Oman	3	2	0	1	17	11	+6	6	Fifth place match
3	Singapore	3	1	0	2	18	12	+6	3	Seventh place match
4	Tajikistan	3	0	0	3	3	43	−40	0	Seventh place match

Source: FIH
Rules for classification: 1) points; 2) matches won; 3) goal difference; 4) goals for; 5) head-to-head result; 6) field goals for.

23 May 2024
15:15

Singapore	2–3	Oman
Mat Rahim 21', 36'	Report	Al-Fazari 18', 19'; Al-Shaaibi 34'

Umpires:
Raman Baskar (MAS)
Daulet Urmanov (KAZ)

23 May 2024
16:30

Indonesia	15–0	Tajikistan
Santoso 1'; Firdaus 5', 6', 11', 12', 37', 38', 38', 39'; Asasi 9'; Prawesti 10', 15', 16', 35'; Fathur 15'	Report

Umpires:
Sean Goh (SGP)
Naser Samadi (IRI)

24 May 2024
15:15

Oman	13–1	Tajikistan
Al-Fazari 6'; Al Alawi 7'; Al Mashari 8', 23'; Madit 11'; Al-Shaaibi 13'; Bait 16', 17', 24'; Barazahan 17', 36', 40'; Al-Noufali 32'	Report	Imomov 28'

Umpires:
Shigeki Kodama (JPN)
Naser Samadi (IRI)

24 May 2024
16:30

Indonesia	5–1	Singapore
Santoso 12'; Jodie 20'; Priliandro 22'; Firdaus 35'; Prawesti 37'	Report	Mat Rahim 17'

Umpires:
Raman Baskar (MAS)
Daulet Urmanov (KAZ)

=== Seventh and eighth place ===
25 May 2024
10:30

Singapore	10–0	Tajikistan
Mat Rahim 7', 10+', 28', 37'; Ng 13'; Ct 22'; Watanabe 30', 38'; Syafia 31'; Wong 32'	Report

Umpires:
Raman Baskar (MAS)
Naser Samadi (IRI)

=== Fifth and sixth place ===
25 May 2024
12:00

Indonesia	5–3	Oman
Priliandro 7'; Jodie 9'; Guntara 17'; Prawesti 21'; Leksono 32'	Report	Al-Fazari 16'; Barazahan 33'; Bait 35'

Umpires:
Shigeki Kodama (JPN)
Daulet Urmanov (KAZ)

== First to fourth place classification ==
=== Pool C ===
Pos	Team	Pld	W	D	L	GF	GA	GD	Pts	Qualification
1	Iran	3	2	1	0	18	10	+8	7	Final and 2025 World Cup
2	Malaysia	3	1	2	0	11	8	+3	5	Final and 2025 World Cup
3	Kazakhstan (H)	3	1	1	1	15	10	+5	4	Third place match
4	Thailand	3	0	0	3	8	24	−16	0	Third place match

Source: FIH
Rules for classification: 1) points; 2) matches won; 3) goal difference; 4) goals for; 5) head-to-head result; 6) field goals for.
(H) Hosts

23 May 2024
17:45

Iran	5–3	Kazakhstan
Mirzakhani 7', 20'; Nooranian 22'; Asnaashari 37', 39'	Report	Dyussebekov 2'; Duisengazy 4'; Yelubayev 12'

Umpires:
Zeke Newman (AUS)
Ahmed Al Hassani (OMA)

23 May 2024
19:00

Malaysia	5–2	Thailand
Jazlan 4', 9'; Azhar 18'; Hamirin 29'; Mohd 37'	Report	A-Nukoon 30', 34'

Umpires:
Shigeki Kodama (JPN)
Salman (INA)

24 May 2024
17:45

Kazakhstan	9–2	Thailand
Duisengazy 2', 30'; Kuatov 10'; Tashkeyev 17', 18', 30'; Yelubayev 24', 40'; Dyussebekov 34'	Report	A-Nukoon 23'; Samoang 28'

Umpires:
Zeke Newman (AUS)
Salman (INA)

24 May 2024
19:00

Malaysia	3–3	Iran
Hamirin 21', 30'; Mohd Zain 28'	Report	Shahrokhi 10', 27'; Mirzakhani 16'

Umpires:
Shigeki Kodama (JPN)
Ahmed Al Hassani (OMA)

=== Third and fourth place ===
25 May 2024
13:30

Kazakhstan	7–2	Thailand
Uzbek 4'; Yelubayev 13', 13', 21', 28', 28'; Dyussebekov 33'	Report	Suyaram 8'; A-Nukoon 32'

Umpires:
Ahmed Al Hassani (OMA)
Raman Baskar (MAS)

=== Final ===
25 May 2024
15:00

Iran	7–1	Malaysia
Mirzakhani 2', 34'; Lashgari 4', 23'; Nooranian 6', 36'; Mamizadeh 10'	Report	Omar 30'

Umpires:
Zeke Newman (AUS)
Salman (INA)

== Final standings ==
Pos	Team	Qualification
1st place, gold medalist(s)	Iran	2025 Indoor Hockey World Cup
2nd place, silver medalist(s)	Malaysia	2025 Indoor Hockey World Cup
3rd place, bronze medalist(s)	Kazakhstan (H)	
4	Thailand	
5	Indonesia	
6	Oman	
7	Singapore	
8	Tajikistan	

Source: FIH
(H) Host

== See also ==
- 2024 Women's Indoor Hockey Asia Cup
