= Philippine Hockey Association =

Governing body of field hockey in the Philippines

Larong Hockey sa Pilipinas
- Sport: Field hockey
- Abbreviation: LHP
- Headquarters: PhilSports Complex, Pasig
- President: Stephen Hontiveros
- Secretary: Jonne Go
- (Philippines)

The Philippine Hockey Association, also known as Larong Hockey sa Pilipinas, Inc. (lit. 'Hockey Sport in the Philippines') is the national governing body for field hockey in the Philippines. It is recognized by the Asian Hockey Federation (AHF) and the International Hockey Federation (IHF).

== Background ==
POC President Peping Cojuangco was appointed as the federation's chairman. In the POC general assembly held on January 27, 2016, the local Olympic body granted their recognition to LHP. Cojuangco resigned in 2021.

In 2019, the Philippine indoor hockey national teams took part in the Men's and Women's Indoor Hockey Asia Cups making their debut in the respective continental tournaments.

The Philippines men's and women's hockey5s team debuted at the 2025 SEA Games. Both teams finished as bronze medalists as the losing semifinalists.

== National teams ==
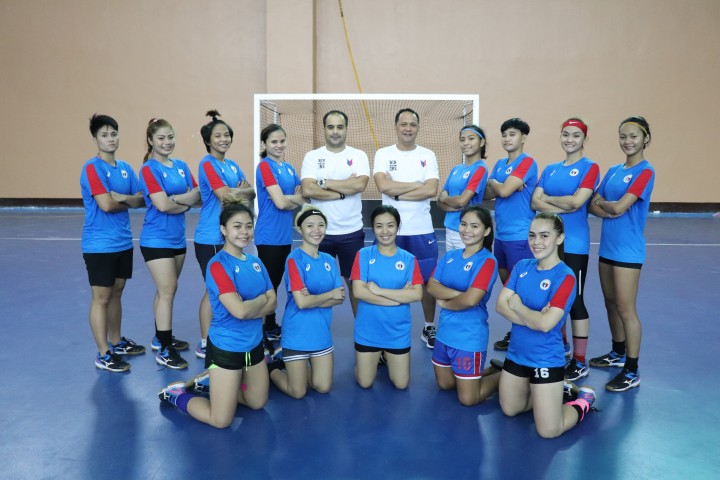
Philippine women's national indoor hockey team in 2019.

Indoor hockey

- Men's national team
- Women's national team

Hockey5

- Men's national team
- Women's national team
