= 2022 Women's Indoor Hockey Asia Cup =

Tournament details
- Host country: Thailand
- City: Bangkok
- Dates: 8–15 August
- Teams: 9 (from 1 confederation)
- Venue: Indoor Stadium Huamark

Final positions
- Champions: Thailand (1st title)
- Runner-up: Indonesia
- Third place: Malaysia

Tournament statistics
- Matches played: 24
- Goals scored: 151 (6.29 per match)
- Top scorer: (Iran) Mirzaei Nasim (11 goals)

The 2022 Women's Indoor Hockey Asia Cup is the eighth edition of the Women's Indoor Hockey Asia Cup, the biennial international women's indoor hockey championship of Asia organized by the Asian Hockey Federation. It is held alongside the men's tournament at the Indoor Stadium Huamark in Bangkok, Thailand from 8 to 15 August 2022.

Thailand who were runner-ups in the previous edition successfully won their first title after four failed attempts previously after defeating Indonesia who also managed to reached their first finals as well be in the top 4, by winning 2–1. Malaysia successfully managed to win against the defending champions, Kazakhstan, by 2–0 and reclaimed the bronze medal after failing to do so in the previous edition.

== Teams ==
Team	FIH Indoor World Rankings	Appearance	Last Appearance	Previous best performance
Cambodia	Not ranked	3rd	2015	5th (2015)
Chinese Taipei	41	3rd	2019	5th (2019)
Indonesia	Not ranked	2nd	2010	5th (2010)
Iran	42	4th	2019	4th (2009)
Kazakhstan	11	8th	2019	1st (2010, 2012, 2014,2015, 2017, 2019)
Malaysia	33	7th	2019	1st (2009)
Pakistan	Not ranked	1st	none	debut
Singapore	45	2nd	2019	8th (2019)
Thailand	17	7th	2019	2nd (2010, 2012 2015, 2017)

== Preliminary round ==
=== Pool A ===
Pos	Team	Pld	W	D	L	GF	GA	GD	Pts	Qualification
1	Kazakhstan	4	3	1	0	26	4	+22	10	Semi-finals
2	Indonesia	4	3	1	0	26	6	+20	10	Semi-finals
3	Iran	4	2	0	2	17	11	+6	6	
4	Chinese Taipei	4	1	0	3	12	16	−4	3	
5	Pakistan	4	0	0	4	1	45	−44	0	

Source: FIH
Rules for classification: 1) points; 2) matches won; 3) goal difference; 4) goals for; 5) head-to-head result; 6) field goals for.

8 August 2022
11:00

Iran	1–3	Indonesia
Mirzaei Nasim 19'	Report	Purbasari Citra 23', 32'; El Islamy Annur 40+'

Umpires:
Annie Thomas (Malaysia)
Mayumi Fujihara (Japan)

8 August 2022
13:30

Chinese Taipei	7–0	Pakistan
Pu Agustin-Linmey 1'; Chen Ting-Chun 2', 36'; Ku Chen-Yi 16', 27'; Ko Ting-Yu 24'; Cai Xin-Xin 40'	Report

Umpires:
Leila Iranzade (Iran)
Ornpimol Kittiteerasopon (Thailand)

9 August 2022
12:15

Chinese Taipei	3–5	Indonesia
Hong Yun-Han 18'; Ku Chen-Yi 25', 39'	Report	Sugiarti Nuraini 16', 34'; El Islamy Annur 20'; Purbasari Citra 31'; Risdiyanti Winda 40'

Umpires:
Rahimah Aziz (Singapore)
Ornpimol Kittiteerasopon (Thailand)

9 August 2022
18:15

Kazakhstan	13–0	Pakistan
Lobanova Viktoriya 1', 6', 8', 12'; Sazontova Natalya 15'; Beisenbay Balzhan 25', 32', 33', 39'; Bissirova Alina 30', 36'; Izbassarova Gulsina 36', 37'	Report

Umpires:
Leila Iranzade (Iran)
Jureporn Oimmak (Thailand)

10 August 2022
13:30

Iran	2–5	Kazakhstan
Mirzaei Nasim 3'; Daei Elham 16'	Report	Lobanova Viktoriya 10', 28'; Lyapina Viktoriya 18'; Beisenbay Balzhan 28', 33'

Umpires:
Aziz Rahimah (Singapore)
Fujihara Mayumi (Japan)

10 August 2022
17:00

Indonesia	16–0	Pakistan
El Islamy Annur 2', 16', 20', 38'; Martika Tamara Raisa 5', 30'; Aulia Rahma Dwi 12', 17', 28', 35'; Purbasari Citra 19', 32'; Sawor Rwede 22'; Sugiarti Nuraini 27', 33'; Patmawati 32'	Report

Umpires:
Thomas Annie (Malaysia)
Oimmak Jureporn (Thailand)

11 August 2022
13:30

Pakistan	1–9	Iran
Sarwar Areeba 14'	Report	Rashidian Zahra 5', 28'; Bahrami Sanaz 19'; Daei Elham 22', 24', 29', 34'; Ahmadi Zeinab 24'; Mirzaei Nasim 35'

Umpires:
Thomas Annie (Malaysia)
Oimmak Jureporn (Thailand)

11 August 2022
17:00

Chinese Taipei	0–6	Kazakhstan
	Report	Lobanova Viktoriya 8', 10'; Bissirova Alina 26', 35'; Lyapina Viktoriya 30', 37'

Umpires:
Kittiteerasopon Ornpimol (Thailand)
Aziz Rahimah (Singapore)

12 August 2022
14:45

Iran	5–2	Chinese Taipei
Mirzaei Nasim 11', 16', 27', 36'; Daei Elham 40'	Report	Ku Chen-Yi 21'; Ko Ting-Yu 24'

Umpires:
Miharjo Susilowati (Indonesia)
Fujihara Mayumi (Japan)

12 August 2022
18:15

Kazakhstan	2–2	Indonesia
Bissirova Alina 15'; Beisenbay Balzhan 34'	Report	Aulia Rahma Dwi 13'; Sugiarti Nuraini 23'

Umpires:
Jones Gemma (England)
Aziz Rahimah (Singapore)

=== Pool B ===
Pos	Team	Pld	W	D	L	GF	GA	GD	Pts	Qualification
1	Malaysia	3	3	0	0	23	1	+22	9	Semi-finals
2	Thailand (H)	3	2	0	1	13	3	+10	6	Semi-finals
3	Cambodia	3	1	0	2	4	19	−15	3	
4	Singapore	3	0	0	3	0	17	−17	0	

Source: FIH
Rules for classification: 1) points; 2) matches won; 3) goal difference; 4) goals for; 5) head-to-head result; 6) field goals for.
(H) Hosts

8 August 2022
14:45

Malaysia	14–1	Cambodia
Yaacob Nur Aisyah 1', 27'; Shabudin Norsharina 3'; Nor Putri 4', 15', 39'; Halimi Qasidah 10'; Sylvester Fazilla 11', 33', 35'; Rashid Nuraini 13', 14', 15', 36'	Report	Sorphron Seng 18'

Umpires:
Assel Mukasheva (Kazakhstan)
Jureporn Oimmak (Thailand)

8 August 2022
18:15

Thailand	8–0	Singapore
Todkaew Jiratchaya 6', 26'; Ongardnarong Sirikorn 14', 17'; Jomjan Priyakorn 15'; Duangwao Wilawan 19', 25', 39'	Report

Umpires:
Gemma Jones (England)
Susilowati Miharjo (Indonesia)

9 August 2022
14:45

Singapore	0–3	Cambodia
	Report	Chakriya Eng 7', 23'; Sorphorn Seng 39'

Umpires:
Samira Kianfar (Iran)
Gemma Jones (England)

10 August 2022
19:30

Malaysia	3–0	Thailand
Hussin Iren 22'; Yaacob Nur Aisyah 23'; Halimi Qasidah 39'	Report

Umpires:
Mukasheva Assel (Kazakhstan)
Miharjo Susilowati (Indonesia)

11 August 2022
19:30

Thailand	5–0	Cambodia
Todkaew Jiratchaya 8', 9', 24'; Sakulpithak Tikhamporn 10'; Pathumpairot Chatchanan 20'	Report

Umpires:
Fujihara Mayumi (Japan)
Kianfar Samira (Iran)

12 August 2022
12:15

Singapore	0–6	Malaysia
	Report	Sylvester Fazilla 19'; Rashid Nuraini 24', 29' nor Putri 24'; Hussin Iren 33'; Halimi Qasidah 34'

Umpires:
Mukasheva Assel (Kazakhstan)
Iranzade Leila (Iran)

== Fifth to eighth place classification ==
=== Bracket ===
Semi-finals
13 August
Iran	5
Singapore	1
13 August
Cambodia	2
Chinese Taipei	3

Fifth place
14 August
Iran	2 (2)
Chinese Taipei	2 (1)
Seventh place
14 August
Singapore	2
Cambodia	0

=== 5–8th place semi-finals ===
13 August 2022
09:30

Iran	5–1	Singapore
Rashidian Zahra 2'; Mirzaei Nasim 9', 26', 33'; Ahmadi Zeinab 35'	Report	O Ming Fen 3'

Umpires:
Mukasheva Assel (Kazakhstan)
Fujihara Mayumi (Japan)

13 August 2022
11:00

Cambodia	2–3	Chinese Taipei
Chansovatey Duch 10'; Koemyean Dy 36'	Report	Ku Chen-Yi 30', 40'; Ko Ting-Yu 34'

Umpires:
Aziz Rahimah (Singapore)
Kianfar Samira (Iran)

=== Seventh place match ===
14 August 2022
14:00

Singapore	2–0	Cambodia
O Ming Fen 3'; Tay Valerie 32'	Report

Umpires:
Iranzade Laila (Iran)
Kianfar Samira (Iran)

=== Fifth place match ===
14 August 2022
17:00

Iran	2–2	Chinese Taipei
Yahyavi Ziba 2'; Mirzaei Nasim 28'	Report	Cai Xin-Xin 12'; Ko Ting-Yu 27'
Penalties
Mirzaei Nasim (penalty shoot-out scored); Yahyavi Ziba (penalty shoot-out scored); Rashidian Zahra (penalty shoot-out missed)	2–1	Ku Chen-Yi (penalty shoot-out scored); Ko Ting-Yu (penalty shoot-out missed); Chen Ting-Chun (penalty shoot-out missed)

Umpires:
Annie Thomas (Malaysia)
Assel Mukasheva (Kazakhstan)

== First to fourth place classification ==
=== Bracket ===
Semi-finals
13 August
Kazakhstan	0
Thailand	6
13 August
Malaysia	0
Indonesia	1

Final
15 August
Thailand	2
Indonesia	1
Third place
15 August
Kazakhstan	0
Malaysia	2

=== Semi-finals ===
13 August 2022
14:00

Kazakhstan	0–6	Thailand
	Report	Sakulpithak Tikhamporn 6', 30'; Todkaew Jiratchaya 7'; Duangwao Wilawan 21', 24', 39'

Umpires:
Thomas Annie (Malaysia)
Miharjo Susilowati (Indonesia)

13 August 2022
17:00

Malaysia	0–1	Indonesia
	Report	Wardani Desi 40'

Umpires:
Kittieteerasopon Ornpimol (Thailand)
Jones Gemma (England)

=== Third place match ===
15 August 2022
15:30

Kazakhstan	0–2	Malaysia
	Report	Hussin Iren 14'; Yaacob Nur Aisyah 38'

Umpires:
Ornpimol Kittiteerasopon (Thailand)
Susilowati Miharjo (Indonesia)

=== Final ===
15 August 2022
18:30

Thailand	2–1	Indonesia
Sakulpithak Tikhamporn 1', 29'	Report	Since Novita 31'

Umpires:
Assel Mukasheva (Kazakhstan)
Thomas Annie (Malaysia)

== Final standing ==
Rank	Team	Record
1st place, gold medalist(s)	Thailand	4-0-1
2nd place, silver medalist(s)	Indonesia	4-1-1
3rd place, bronze medalist(s)	Malaysia	4-0-1
4	Kazakhstan	3-1-2
5	Iran	3-1-2
6	Chinese Taipei	2-0-5
7	Singapore	1-0-4
8	Cambodia	1-0-4
9	Pakistan	0-0-4

== See also ==
- 2022 Men's Indoor Hockey Asia Cup
- 2022 Women's Hockey Asia Cup
