= Indoor hockey at the 2023 SEA Games – Men's tournament =

Men's indoor hockey at the 2023 SEA Games
Tournament details
- Host country: Cambodia
- City: Phnom Penh
- Dates: 1–7 May
- Teams: 6 (from 1 confederation)
- Venue: Dinosaur Park Hall

Final positions
- Champions: Indonesia (1st title)
- Runner-up: Malaysia

Tournament statistics
- Matches played: 16
- Goals scored: 142 (8.88 per match)
- Top scorer: (Indonesia) Alfiana Muhamad (15 goals)

The men's field hockey tournament at the 2023 SEA Games will take place from 1 to 7 May 2023 at the Dinosaur Park Hall, Phnom Penh, Cambodia. 6 teams took part in the competition.

== Squad ==
Cambodia (CAM)	Indonesia (INA)	Malaysia (MAS)
Head Coach: (Pakistan) Rana Asif Maqsood; Chanty Chorn; Rasheed Ammar; Nokhaiz Ahmad; Khawar Shaib; Rana Ur; Rana Ammar; Arslan Muhamad; Yasir Muhamad; Aamir Khan; Rehman Abdul; Salman Butt; Rana Anas	Head Coach: (Malaysia) Dhaarma Raj; Kusuma Ilham; Prawesti Candra; Rahman Ferdian; Firdaus Muhammad; Nugraha Fajar; Santoso Prima; Fajar Alam; Priliandro Revo; Alfiana Muhamad; Guntara Andrea; Leksono Adi; Rahmad Astri	Head Coach: (Malaysia) Hanip Che Halim; Khairul Kamaruzaman; Syafiq Syed Cholan; Norhafizie Jamil Azomi; Razali Mohd Hazemi; Muhammad Firdaus Omar; Muhammad Aslam Hanafiah; Izham Azhar; Abdul Khaliq Hamirin; Faridzul Afiq; Danial Asyraf Abdul Ghani; Adam Aiman Mamat; Hazrul Faiz Ahmad Sobri
Philippines (PHI)	Singapore (SGP)	Thailand (THA)
Head Coach: (Philippines) Christian Galicia; Julius Salvacion; Rolly Bustamante; Eleazar Cuello; Michael Escarcha; Nelson Ronquillo; Jhon Burga; Charlie Palic; Johnny Demata; Miguelito Anabe; Fernand Cumal; Marc Ramos; Eric Dumlao	Head Coach: (Malaysia) Redzuan Ponirin; Chen Aik Yu; Loogeswaran; Syed Ali; Jumaeen Amat Kamsin; Arasu Ct Karuppiah; Muhammad Mat Rahim; Hanif Murid; Guhan Mayazhagu; Yang Goh Kai; Muhammad Syafiq; Abdul Rashid Muhammad Shafiq; Gerald Wong	Head Coach: (Iran) Safaei Esfandyar; Arithat Chalattam; Thanawat Wiyaboon; Jarernchai Noonee; Anuson Suyaram; Pongpon Sukwong; Nichanon Ketsawad; Thoranin Trongthaisong; Warawut A-Nukoon; Kittithat Sori; Sarawut Wangchua; Wiros Yotsiri; Warun Boonpea

== Results ==
=== Group stage ===
Pos	Team	Pld	W	D	L	GF	GA	GD	Pts	Qualification
1	Malaysia	5	5	0	0	42	6	+36	15	Advance to Gold Medal Match
2	Indonesia	5	4	0	1	38	4	+34	12	Advance to Gold Medal Match
3	Thailand	5	3	0	2	28	10	+18	9	Bronze Medal
4	Singapore	5	2	0	3	16	17	−1	6	Bronze Medal
5	Cambodia (H)	5	1	0	4	12	27	−15	3	
6	Philippines	5	0	0	5	0	72	−72	0	

Source: FIH
(H) Hosts

1 May 2023
13:00

Thailand	14–0	Philippines
Suyaram Anuson 6', 12'; Boonpea Warun 7', 8', 22', 26', 27'; A-Nukoon Warawut 15', 20', 27', 34'; Sori Kittithat 24'; Sukwong Pongpon 29'; Ketsawad Nichanon 31'	Report

Umpires:
Shahbaz Ali (Bangladesh)
Zeke Newman (Australia)

1 May 2023
15:30

Singapore	0–7	Indonesia
	Report	Prawesti Candra 1'; Alfiana Muhamad 3', 10', 27'; Santoso Prima 8', 12'; Rahmad Astri 29'

Umpires:
Phiraphat Niensupornphand (Thailand)
Raman Baskar (Malaysia)

1 May 2023
18:00

Malaysia	10–1	Cambodia
Mohd Faridzul 0', 22', 31'; Hamirin Khaliq 4', 36'; Abdul Daniel 7'; Azhar Muhamad 21'; Omar Firdaus 21'; Cholan Syed 27'; Jamil Azomi Norhafizie 39'	Report	Rana Ammar 29'

Umpires:
Sunny Wang (Singapore)
Alberto Sitepu (Indonesia)

2 May 2023
13:00

Malaysia	19–0	Philippines
Mohd Faridzul 0', 14', 20', 33'; Hamirin Khaliq 2', 11'; Azhar Muhamad 3', 24'; Mamat Adam 7', 29'; Cholan Syed 15', 24', 25', 28'; Abdul Danial 16', 29'; Omar Firdaus 22'; Mohd Hazemi Razali 27', 36'	Report

Umpires:
Shigeki Kodama (Japan)
Sunny Wang (Singapore)

2 May 2023
15:30

Thailand	0–3	Indonesia
	Report	Firdaus Muhammad 7'; Prawesti Candra 22'; Alfiana Muhamad 37'

Umpires:
Zeke Newman (Australia)
Raman Baskar (Malaysia)

2 May 2023
18:00

Cambodia	1–4	Singapore
Rasheed Ammar 23'	Report	Murid Hanif 2'; Mat Rahim Muhammad 12'; Goh Kai Yang 17', 30'

Umpires:
Ali Shahbaz (Bangladesh)
Alberto Sitepu (Indonesia)

3 May 2023
11:45

Indonesia	20–0	Philippines
Prawesti Candra 0'; Alfiana Muhamad 3', 8', 9', 9', 10', 11', 12', 21', 29', 29'; Santoso Prima 13', 38'; Firdaus Muhammad 16', 27'; Priliandro Revo 25'; Rahmad Astri 25', 35', 36'; Guntara Andrea 28'	Report

Umpires:
Zeke Newman (Australia)
Phiraphat Niensupornphand (Thailand)

3 May 2023
14:15

Singapore	0–5	Malaysia
	Report	Abdul Danial 7'; Azhar Muhamad 12', 34'; Mohd Faridzul 24'; Cholan Syed 25'

Umpires:
Ali Shahbaz (Bangladesh)
Shigeki Kodama (Japan)

3 May 2023
16:45

Cambodia	1–7	Thailand
Rasheed Ammar 0'	Report	Boonpea Warun 4', 17', 28'; A-Nukoon Warawut 10', 14'; Sori Kittithat 29'; Sukwong Pongpon 31'

Umpires:
Sunny Wang (Singapore)
Raman Baskar (Malaysia)

4 May 2023
13:00

Philippines	0–11	Singapore
	Report	Mat Rahim Muhammad 3', 13', 22'; Muhammad Syafiq 7'; Wong Gerald 9', 27'; Abdul Rashid 14'; Syed Ali 18'; Goh Kai Yang 20', 23'; Murid Hanif 31'

Umpires:
Phiraphat Niensupornphand (Thailand)
Alberto Sitepu (Indonesia)

4 May 2023
15:30

Thailand	3–5	Malaysia
Suyaram Anuson 7'; A-Nukoon Warawut 32', 33'	Report	Mohd Faridzul 10', 37'; Azhar Muhamad 11'; Mohd Hazemi Razali 18'; Omar Firdaus 25'

Umpires:
Zeke Newman (Australia)
Sunny Wang (Singapore)

4 May 2023
18:00

Indonesia	6–1	Cambodia
Alfiana Muhamad 1', 11', 17', 39'; Prawesti Candra 21'; Santoso Prima 36'	Report	Rasheed Ammar 36'

Umpires:
Shigeki Kodama (Japan)
Raman Baskar (Malaysia)

6 May 2023
11:45

Malaysia	3–2	Indonesia
Omar Firdaus 12'; Hamirin Khaliq 34'; Cholan Syed 36'	Report	Prawesti Candra 5'; Firdaus Muhammad 29'

Umpires:
Ali Shahbaz (Bangladesh)
Shigeki Kodama (Japan)

6 May 2023
14:15

Singapore	1–4	Thailand
Mayazhagu Guhan 7'	Report	A-Nukoon Warawut 14', 23', 34'; Sori Kittithat 27'

Umpires:
Shigeki Kodama (Japan)
Raman Baskar (Malaysia)

6 May 2023
16:45

Philippines	0–8	Cambodia
	Report	Yasir Muhamad 7', 36'; Salman Butt 9', 33', 33'; Rana Ur 12'; Nokhaiz Ahmad 31'; Rasheed Ammar 32'

Umpires:
Sunny Wang (Singapore)
Phiraphat Niensupornphand (Thailand)

=== Gold Medal Match ===
7 May 2023
16:30

Malaysia	3–3	Indonesia
Abdul Danial 15'; Omar Firdaus 20'; Mohd Faridzul 23'	Report	Firdaus Muhammad 36'; Rahman Ferdian 38'; Alfiana Muhamad 39'
Penalties
Jamil Azomi Norhafizie (penalty shoot-out missed); Hamirin Khaliq (penalty shoot-out scored); Azhar Muhamad (penalty shoot-out missed)	1–2	Santoso Prima (penalty shoot-out scored); Rahman Ferdian (penalty shoot-out missed); Guntara Andrea (penalty shoot-out scored)

Umpires:
Zeke Newman (Australia)
Ali Shahbaz (Bangladesh)

== Final standings ==
Rank	Team
1st place, gold medalist(s)	Indonesia
2nd place, silver medalist(s)	Malaysia
3rd place, bronze medalist(s)	Thailand
3rd place, bronze medalist(s)	Singapore
5	Cambodia
6	Philippines

== See also ==
- Indoor hockey at the 2023 SEA Games – Women's tournament
