= 2019 Women's Indoor Hockey Asia Cup =

2019 Women's Indoor Asia Cup
Tournament details
- Host country: Thailand
- City: Chonburi
- Dates: 15–21 July
- Teams: 9 (from 1 confederation)

Final positions
- Champions: Kazakhstan (6th title)
- Runner-up: Thailand
- Third place: Uzbekistan

Tournament statistics
- Matches played: 23
- Goals scored: 121 (5.26 per match)
- Top scorer: (Kazakhstan) Natalya Gataulina (12 goals)

The 2019 Women's Indoor Asia Cup was the seventh edition of the Women's Indoor Hockey Asia Cup, the biennial international women's indoor hockey championship of Asia organized by the Asian Hockey Federation. It was held alongside the men's tournament in Chonburi, Thailand from 15 to 21 July 2019.

Kazakhstan were the defending champions having won the 2017 edition. They defended their title by defeating the hosts Thailand 3–1 in the final. Uzbekistan won the bronze medal by defeating Malaysia 1–0 in a shoot-out.

== Teams ==
For the first time nine teams competed in the tournament which was the highest number of competing teams ever. Nepal, the Philippines, and Singapore made their debuts.

Team	FIH Indoor World Ranking	Appearance	Last Appearance	Previous best performance
Chinese Taipei	37	2nd	2012	6th (2012)
Iran	36	3rd	2012	4th (2009)
Kazakhstan	13	7th	2017	1st (2010, 2012, 2014, 2015, 2017)
Malaysia	33	6th	2017	1st (2009)
Nepal	Not ranked	1st	None	Debut
Philippines	Not ranked	1st	None	Debut
Singapore	Not ranked	1st	None	Debut
Thailand	26	7th	2017	2nd (2010, 2012, 2015)
Uzbekistan	36	6th	2017	3rd (2009, 2015)

== Results ==
The match schedule and pools compositions were released on 21 May 2019 by the Asian Hockey Federation.

All times are local, ICT (UTC+7).

=== Preliminary round ===
==== Pool A ====
Pos	Team	Pld	W	D	L	GF	GA	GD	Pts	Qualification
1	Kazakhstan	4	4	0	0	31	2	+29	12	Semi-finals
2	Uzbekistan	4	3	0	1	26	8	+18	9	Semi-finals
3	Iran	4	2	0	2	11	11	0	6	Fifth place game
4	Nepal	4	1	0	3	4	24	−20	3	Seventh place game
5	Philippines	4	0	0	4	2	29	−27	0	Cross-over

Source: FIH

15 July 2019
16:00

Uzbekistan	9–0	Nepal
Berdieva 2', 28'; S. Adizova 6', 16', 26', 27'; Ramazonova 14'; K. Adizova 36'	Report

Umpires:
Ayu Zainuddin (MAS)
Jongjit Boonmee (THA)

15 July 2019
18:40

Iran	5–0	Philippines
Mirzaei 14', FG'; Bahrami 20'; Yahyavi 39'	Report

Umpires:
Kumarasan Ramasamy (SGP)
Nor Akma Hashim (MAS)

16 July 2019
12:40

Kazakhstan	8–0	Nepal
Sabazova 2'; Gataulina 6', 26', 38'; Dobrioglo 12', 28'; Sazontova 19'; Lobanova 34'	Report

Umpires:
Ayu Zainuddin (MAS)
Sedigheh Nasiri (IRI)

16 July 2019
17:20

Uzbekistan	11–0	Philippines
S. Adizova 2', 13', 26', 26'; K. Adizova 10', 33'; Khasanboeva 11', 21'; Ramazonova 27', 31'; Shokirova 36'	Report

Umpires:
Cookie Tan (SGP)
Assel Mukasheva (KAZ)

17 July 2019
11:20

Philippines	2–3	Nepal
Obasa 7'; Castillo 21'	Report	Pandey 14'; BK 29', 36'

Umpires:
Jongjit Boonmee (THA)
Sedigheh Nasiri (IRI)

17 July 2019
17:20

Iran	0–6	Kazakhstan
	Report	Domashneva 7', 18', 26'; Dobrioglo 13'; Chepkassova 36'; Gataulina 38'

Umpires:
Ayu Zainuddin (MAS)
Yanisa Pimsan (THA)

18 July 2019
11:20

Uzbekistan	2–7	Kazakhstan
K. Adizova 30', 32'	Report	Gataulina 14', 15', 21', 24', 38'; Domashneva 29'; Chepkassova 35'

Umpires:
Yanisa Pimsan (THA)
Ayu Zainuddin (MAS)

18 July 2019
14:00

Nepal	1–5	Iran
Chand 23'	Report	Daei 7'; Bahrami 11', 15', 35'; Ghandbari 38'

Umpires:
Assel Mukasheva (KAZ)
Tamila Amridinova (UZB)

19 July 2019
12:40

Iran	1–4	Uzbekistan
Khaleghi 29'	Report	Khasanboeva 10', 16'; K. Adizova 15', 27'

Umpires:
Kristy Robertson (AUS)
Cookie Tan (SGP)

19 July 2019
16:00

Kazakhstan	10–0	Philippines
Domashneva 3', 8', 30', 31'; Dobrioglo 9'; Lobanova 13'; Chepkassova 24', 27', 28'	Report

Umpires:
Sedigheh Nasiri (IRI)
Jongjit Boonmee (THA)

==== Pool B ====
Pos	Team	Pld	W	D	L	GF	GA	GD	Pts	Qualification
1	Thailand (H)	3	3	0	0	11	1	+10	9	Semi-finals
2	Malaysia	3	2	0	1	7	2	+5	6	Semi-finals
3	Chinese Taipei	3	1	0	2	4	10	−6	3	Fifth place game
4	Singapore	3	0	0	3	0	9	−9	0	Cross-over

Source: FIH
(H) Hosts

15 July 2019
12:40

Malaysia	4–0	Singapore
Nur Azhar 9', 14'; Nur Mohammad 27'; Ellias 40+'	Report

Umpires:
Melina Illanes (ARG)
Kristy Robertson (AUS)

16 July 2019
20:00

Thailand	8–0	Chinese Taipei
Tongkham 1', 9', 32', 35'; Sakulpithak 15', 32'; Saubsing 26'; Khamsaeng 27'	Report

Umpires:
Kristy Robertson (AUS)
Tamila Amridinova (UZB)

17 July 2019
14:00

Chinese Taipei	4–0	Singapore
Ku 4'; Chen T. 15'; Hong 19', 37'	Report

Umpires:
Melina Illanes (ARG)
Tamila Amridinova (UZB)

17 July 2019
20:00

Malaysia	1–2	Thailand
Nur 29'	Report	Sakulpithak 6', 15'

Umpires:
Kristy Robertson (AUS)
Assel Mukasheva (KAZ)

18 July 2019
18:40

Chinese Taipei	0–2	Malaysia
	Report	Siti 23'; Azhar 30'

Umpires:
Melina Illanes (ARG)
Cookie Tan (SGP)

19 July 2019
18:40

Thailand	1–0	Singapore
Tongkham 38'	Report

Umpires:
Melina Illanes (ARG)
Assel Mukasheva (KAZ)

=== Fifth to ninth place classification ===
Cross-over
20 July
Philippines	1 (2)
Singapore (s.o.)	1 (3)

Seventh place
21 July
Nepal	2
Singapore	1

==== Cross-over ====
20 July 2019
12:30

Philippines	1–1	Singapore
Castillo 27'	Report	Noor 19'
Penalties
Obasa (penalty shoot-out missed); Domaplin (penalty shoot-out missed); Castillo (penalty shoot-out scored); Castillo (penalty shoot-out scored); Obasa (penalty shoot-out missed); Domaplin (penalty shoot-out missed)	2–3	(penalty shoot-out missed) Joan Lim; (penalty shoot-out missed) Janna Lim; (penalty shoot-out scored) Juliette Lim; (penalty shoot-out scored) Juliette Lim; (penalty shoot-out missed) Janna Lim; (penalty shoot-out scored) Joan Lim

Umpires:
Yanisa Pimsan (THA)
Jongjit Boonmee (THA)

==== Seventh and eighth place ====
21 July 2019
11:00

Nepal	2–1	Singapore
Meche 19'; Bk 36'	Report	Ibrahim 27'

Umpires:
Jongjit Boonmee (THA)
Sedigheh Nasiri (IRI)

==== Fifth and sixth place ====
20 July 2019
14:00

Iran	1–2	Chinese Taipei
Balooch 30'	Report	Ko 14', 37'

Umpires:
Assel Mukasheva (KAZ)
Yanisa Pimsan (THA)

=== First to fourth place classification ===
Semi-finals
20 July
Kazakhstan	2
Malaysia	1
20 July
Thailand	5
Uzbekistan	3

Final
21 July
Kazakhstan	3
Thailand	1
Third place
21 July
Malaysia	1 (0)
Uzbekistan (s.o.)	1 (1)

==== Semi-finals ====
20 July 2019
15:30

Kazakhstan	2–1	Malaysia
Gataulina 6'; Domashneva 22'	Report	Ellias 32'

Umpires:
Melina Illanes (ARG)
Cookie Tan (SGP)

20 July 2019
17:00

Thailand	5–3	Uzbekistan
Saubsing 10'; Sakulpithak 16', 24', 34'; Todkaew 30'	Report	Ramazonova 5'; S. Adizova 6'; Berdieva 35'

Umpires:
Kristy Robertson (AUS)
Ayu Zainuddin (MAS)

==== Third and fourth place ====
21 July 2019
14:00

Malaysia	1–1	Uzbekistan
Isahhidun 40'	Report	K. Adizova 32'
Penalties
Azhar (penalty shoot-out missed); Isahhidun (penalty shoot-out missed); Mohd (penalty shoot-out missed)	0–1	(penalty shoot-out missed) K.Adizova; (penalty shoot-out scored) S. Adizova; (penalty shoot-out missed) Berdieva

Umpires:
Kristy Robertson (AUS)
Cookie Tan (SGP)

==== Final ====
21 July 2019
17:00

Kazakhstan	3–1	Thailand
Gataulina 9', 37'; Dobrioglo 20'	Report	Sakulpithak 2'

Umpires:
Melina Illanes (ARG)
Ayu Zainuddin (MAS)

== Final standings ==
Pos	Team	Qualification
1	Kazakhstan	2022 FIH Indoor Hockey World Cup
2	Thailand (H)	
3	Uzbekistan	
4	Malaysia	
5	Chinese Taipei	
6	Iran	
7	Nepal	
8	Singapore	
9	Philippines	

Source: FIH
(H) Host

== See also ==
- 2019 Men's Indoor Hockey Asia Cup
