= 2019 Men's Indoor Hockey Asia Cup =

2019 Men's Indoor Asia Cup
Tournament details
- Host country: Thailand
- City: Chonburi
- Dates: 15–21 July
- Teams: 10 (from 1 confederation)

Final positions
- Champions: Iran (8th title)
- Runner-up: Kazakhstan
- Third place: Malaysia

Tournament statistics
- Matches played: 27
- Goals scored: 244 (9.04 per match)
- Top scorer(s): (Iran) Navid Taherirad (22 goals)

The 2019 Men's Indoor Asia Cup was the eighth edition of the Men's Indoor Hockey Asia Cup, the biennial international men's indoor hockey championship of Asia organized by the Asian Hockey Federation. It was held alongside the women's tournament in Chonburi, Thailand from 15 to 21 July 2019.

Iran were the defending champions having won the 2017 edition. Iran defended their title by defeating Kazakhstan 10–0 in the final. Malaysia won the bronze medal by defeating Uzbekistan 6–3.

== Teams ==
For the first time ever there were 10 teams competing in the tournament which is the highest amount of competing teams ever. Bangladesh, Nepal and the Philippines made their debuts.

| Team | FIH Indoor World Rankings | Appearance | Last Appearance | Previous best performance |
|---|---|---|---|---|
| Bangladesh | Not ranked | 1st | None | Debut |
| Chinese Taipei | 32 | 4th | 2017 | 4th (2014) |
| Iran | 4 | 8th | 2017 | 1st (2008, 2009, 2010, 2012, 2014, 2015, 2017) |
| Kazakhstan | 13 | 6th | 2017 | 2nd (2015, 2017) |
| Malaysia | 24 | 7th | 2017 | 2nd (2008, 2009, 2010, 2014) |
| Nepal | Not ranked | 1st | None | Debut |
| Philippines | Not ranked | 1st | None | Debut |
| Singapore | Not ranked | 2nd | 2008 | 5th (2008) |
| Thailand | 29 | 6th | 2017 | 4th (2012) |
| Uzbekistan | 19 | 7th | 2017 | 2nd (2012) |

== Results ==
The match schedule and pools compositions were released on 21 May 2019 by the Asian Hockey Federation.

All times are local, ICT (UTC+7).

=== Preliminary round ===
==== Pool A ====
| Pos | Team | Pld | W | D | L | GF | GA | GD | Pts | Qualification |
|---|---|---|---|---|---|---|---|---|---|---|
| 1 | Iran | 4 | 4 | 0 | 0 | 37 | 5 | +32 | 12 | Semi-finals |
| 2 | Malaysia | 4 | 3 | 0 | 1 | 29 | 6 | +23 | 9 | Semi-finals |
| 3 | Thailand (H) | 4 | 2 | 0 | 2 | 16 | 11 | +5 | 6 | Fifth place game |
| 4 | Bangladesh | 4 | 1 | 0 | 3 | 10 | 17 | −7 | 3 | Seventh place game |
| 5 | Philippines | 4 | 0 | 0 | 4 | 4 | 57 | −53 | 0 | Ninth place game |

Source: FIH
(H) Hosts

15 July 2019
11:20

| Malaysia | 6–0 | Bangladesh |
|---|---|---|
| Yaacob 2', 20+'; Faridzul 5', 37'; Silverius 15'; Omar 39' | Report |

Umpires:
Makhsudbek Urmanov (KAZ)
Sedric Makati (NAM)

15 July 2019
20:00

| Thailand | 10–1 | Philippines |
|---|---|---|
| Kampanthong 4', 6', 21'; Trongthaisong 15'; Khamwong 16'; Yosiri 19', 40'; Anukoon 24'; Boonpea 22', 34' | Report | Forio 26' |

Umpires:
Tsai Ming-Chun (TPE)
Ashim Sharma (NEP)

16 July 2019
14:00

| Iran | 8–0 | Bangladesh |
|---|---|---|
| Nooranian 1', 3'; Norouzzadeh 5', 22', 39'; Mirzakhanian 16'; Taherirad 30'; Beiranvand 40+' | Report |

Umpires:
Makhsudbek Urmanov (KAZ)
Adam Barry (AUS)

16 July 2019
16:00

| Malaysia | 20–1 | Philippines |
|---|---|---|
| Mustafa 3', 32'; Omar 5', 18', 19'; Faridzul 7', 20+', 33', 34'; Yaacob 9', 11', 40', 40'; Zain 12', 26'; Azhar 21', 22', 23'; Silverius 27', 33' | Report | Lianza 31' |

Umpires:
Siyabonga Martins (NAM)
Sunny Wang (SGP)

17 July 2019
10:00

| Philippines | 0–9 | Bangladesh |
|---|---|---|
| | Report | M. Islam 4', 5', 11', 20', 30', 36'; A. Islam 9'; Mahmud 17', 33' |

Umpires:
Raman Baskar (MAS)
Rinat Ahmadulin (UZB)

17 July 2019
18:40

| Thailand | 2–7 | Iran |
|---|---|---|
| Kampanthong 18'; Yosiri 39' | Report | Taherirad 10', 14', 15'; Norouzzadeh 14', 28'; Beiranvand 20+', 23' |

Umpires:
Adam Barry (AUS)
Sedric Makati (NAM)

18 July 2019
17:20

| Malaysia | 1–4 | Iran |
|---|---|---|
| Che Halim 28' | Report | Norouzzadeh 6', 35'; Asnaashari 19'; Nooranian 40' |

Umpires:
Adam Barry (AUS)
Siyabonga Martins (NAM)

18 July 2019
20:00

| Bangladesh | 1–3 | Thailand |
|---|---|---|
| M. Islam 36' | Report | Boonpea 3'; Kampanthong 6', 34' |

Umpires:
Diego Barbas (ARG)
Makhsudbek Urmanov(KAZ)

19 July 2019
14:00

| Iran | 18–2 | Philippines |
|---|---|---|
| Karimi 4', 5', 27'; Taherirad 6', 11', 13', 23', 28', 24', 38', 40'; Norouzzadeh 11', 18', 19', 30'; Bahrami 17'; Mirzakhanian 29', 31' | Report | Forio 10'; Guinto 37' |

Umpires:
Phiraphat Niensupornphand (THA)
Rinat Ahmadulin (UZB)

19 July 2019
20:00

| Thailand | 1–2 | Malaysia |
|---|---|---|
| Boonpea 38' | Report | Zain 15', 37' |

Umpires:
Diego Barbas (ARG)
Sedric Makati (NAM)

==== Pool B ====
| Pos | Team | Pld | W | D | L | GF | GA | GD | Pts | Qualification |
|---|---|---|---|---|---|---|---|---|---|---|
| 1 | Kazakhstan | 4 | 4 | 0 | 0 | 31 | 5 | +26 | 12 | Semi-finals |
| 2 | Uzbekistan | 4 | 3 | 0 | 1 | 23 | 9 | +14 | 9 | Semi-finals |
| 3 | Singapore | 4 | 2 | 0 | 2 | 21 | 9 | +12 | 6 | Fifth place game |
| 4 | Chinese Taipei | 4 | 1 | 0 | 3 | 11 | 26 | −15 | 3 | Seventh place game |
| 5 | Nepal | 4 | 0 | 0 | 4 | 10 | 47 | −37 | 0 | Ninth place game |

Source: FIH

15 July 2019
14:00

| Chinese Taipei | 1–3 | Singapore |
|---|---|---|
| Lin T. 26' | Report | Loke 25'; Grewal 37'; Abdul Rashid 39' |

Umpires:
Phiraphat Niensupornphand (THA)
Raman Baskar (MAS)

15 July 2019
17:20

| Uzbekistan | 13–2 | Nepal |
|---|---|---|
| Satlikov 2', 4', 6', 13', 16', 24', 26', 28', 40+'; Madaminov 35', 38'; Buronov 30'; Aslanov 39' | Report | Rana 17'; Chhetri 40' |

Umpires:
Noppadon Prompim (THA)
Shahbaz Ali (BAN)

16 July 2019
11:20

| Kazakhstan | 12–1 | Nepal |
|---|---|---|
| Tashkeyev 4', 36'; Dyussebekov 6', 8', 24'; Yelubayev 10', 20', 38', 40'; Urmanov 15', 26', 37' | Report | Rana 31' |

Umpires:
Noppadon Prompim(THA)
Diego Barbas(ARG)

16 July 2019
18:40

| Uzbekistan | 2–1 | Singapore |
|---|---|---|
| Satlikov 39'; Madaminov 40' | Report | Grewal 37' |

Umpires:
Phiraphat Niensupornphand (THA)
Amir Safara (IRI)

17 July 2019
12:40

| Singapore | 15–1 | Nepal |
|---|---|---|
| Mayazhagu 3', 12'; Goh 6', 35', 36'; Grewal 11', 15', 32'; Loke 18'; Rifiqi 19', 39'; Abdul Rashid 20'; Mat Rahim 24', 37'; Yuhari 30' | Report | BK 40+' |

Umpires:
Diego Barbas (ARG)
Shahbaz Ali (BAN)

17 July 2019
16:00

| Chinese Taipei | 1–10 | Kazakhstan |
|---|---|---|
| Chiu 7' | Report | Tashkeyev 6', 17', 18', 34'; Uzbek 12'; Sansyzbayev 15', 31', 38'; Zhokenbayev 20'; Dyussebekov 27' |

Umpires:
Siyabonga Martins (NAM)
Sunny Wang (SGP)

18 July 2019
12:40

| Uzbekistan | 1–4 | Kazakhstan |
|---|---|---|
| Madaminov 4' | Report | Dyussebekov 14'; Tashkeyev 27'; Urmanov 35'; Uzbek 39' |

Umpires:
Shahbaz Ali (BAN)
Sedric Makati (NAM)

18 July 2019
16:00

| Nepal | 6–7 | Chinese Taipei |
|---|---|---|
| Chhetri 11', 14'; Rana 12', 18', 19', 25' | Report | Chiu 3'; Li 5', 8', 25', 32'; Lin Y. 16'; Yu 16' |

Umpires:
Amir Safara (IRI)
Rinat Ahmadulin (UZB)

19 July 2019
11:20

| Chinese Taipei | 2–7 | Uzbekistan |
|---|---|---|
| Wu C.C 7'; Li 24' | Report | Satlikov 3', 16', 17', 20'; Madaminov 19', 31'; Kalandarov 28' |

Umpires:
Noppadon Prompim (THA)
Siyabonga Martins (NAM)

19 July 2019
17:20

| Kazakhstan | 5–2 | Singapore |
|---|---|---|
| Uzbek 10'; Tashkeyev 25'; Dyussebekov 34'; Sansyzbayev 35'; Yelubayev 38' | Report | Mayazhagu 5'; Goh 20' |

Umpires:
Raman Baskar (MAS)
Adam Barry (AUS)

=== Fifth to tenth place classification ===
==== Ninth and tenth place ====
20 July 2019
11:00

| Philippines | 0–3 | Nepal |
|---|---|---|
| | Report | Chhetri 18', 34'; Rana 31' |

Umpires:
Shahbaz Ali (BAN)
Amir Safara (IRI)

==== Seventh and eighth place ====
20 July 2019
14:00

| Bangladesh | 9–0 | Chinese Taipei |
|---|---|---|
| A. Islam 5', 18'; M.M. Hossain 15', 20'; Mahmud 20'; Shetul 26', 32'; M. Islam 28'; Rahman 33' | Report |

Umpires:
Phiraphat Niensupornphand (THA)
Sunny Wang (SGP)

==== Fifth and sixth place ====
21 July 2019
12:30

| Thailand | 4–0 | Singapore |
|---|---|---|
| Kampanthong 5', 10', 35'; Boonpea 11' | Report |

Umpires:
Raman Baskar (MAS)
Siyabonga Martins (NAM)

=== First to fourth place classification ===
Semi-finals
20 July
Iran | 9
Uzbekistan | 1
20 July
Kazakhstan | 4
Malaysia | 3

Final
21 July
Iran | 10
Kazakhstan | 0
Third place
21 July
Uzbekistan | 3
Malaysia | 6

==== Semi-finals ====
20 July 2019
18:30

| Iran | 9–1 | Uzbekistan |
|---|---|---|
| Norouzzadeh 5', 29', 30', 31', 38'; Taherirad 5', 15', 33'; Beiranvand 13' | Report | Buronov 18' |

Umpires:
Diego Barbas (ARG)
Sedric Makati (NAM)

20 July 2019
20:00

| Kazakhstan | 4–3 | Malaysia |
|---|---|---|
| Tashkeyev 16', 34'; Urmanov 27', 30' | Report | Zain 4'; Yaacob 4'; Omar 22' |

Umpires:
Adam Barry (AUS)
Siyabonga Martins (NAM)

==== Third and fourth place ====
21 July 2019
15:30

| Uzbekistan | 3–6 | Malaysia |
|---|---|---|
| Ismailov 6'; Satlikov 9', 38' | Report | Omar 3', 31'; Che Halim 7', 25', 32'; Zain 23' |

Umpires:
Sedric Makati (NAM)
Sunny Wang (SGP)

==== Final ====
21 July 2019
18:30

| Iran | 10–0 | Kazakhstan |
|---|---|---|
| Taherirad 2', 6', 6', 7', 39', 39', 40'; Norouzzadeh 5', 5'; Mirzakhanian 10' | Report |

Umpires:
Diego Barbas (ARG)
Adam Barry (AUS)

== Final standings ==
| Pos | Team | Qualification |
|---|---|---|
| 1 | Iran | 2022 FIH Indoor Hockey World Cup |
| 2 | Kazakhstan | 2022 FIH Indoor Hockey World Cup |
| 3 | Malaysia | |
| 4 | Uzbekistan | |
| 5 | Thailand (H) | |
| 6 | Singapore | |
| 7 | Bangladesh | |
| 8 | Chinese Taipei | |
| 9 | Nepal | |
| 10 | Philippines | |

Source: FIH
(H) Host

== See also ==
- 2019 Women's Indoor Hockey Asia Cup
