= Philippines men's national indoor hockey team =

Philippines
- Association: Philippine Hockey Association
- Confederation: AHF (Asia)

FIH ranking
- Current: NR(January 2026)

Asia Cup
- Appearances: 1 (first in 2019)
- Best result: 9th (2019)

The Philippines men's national indoor hockey team represents the Philippines in men's international indoor hockey and is controlled by the Philippine Hockey Association.

== History ==
The Philippines men's national indoor hockey team was formed in 2017. They took part at the 2017 SEA Games in Malaysia in August.

They made their debut, and so far their only appearance at the Men's Indoor Hockey Asia Cup in the 2019 edition in Thailand.

They have also took part at the 2019 SEA Games at home, and the subsequent 2023 in Cambodia and Thailand respectively.

== Records ==
=== Asian Cup ===
Asia Cup record
Year	Host	Position	Pld	W	D	L	GF	GA
2019	Chonburi, Thailand	10th	5	0	0	5	4	60
2022	Bangkok, Thailand	Did not enter						
2024	Chonburi, Thailand	Did not enter						

=== SEA Games ===
SEA Games record
Year	Host	Position	Pld	W	D	L	GF	GA
2017	Segambut, Malaysia	6th	5	0	0	6	2	65
2019	Los Baños, Philippines	5th	4	0	0	4	2	17
2023	Phnom Penh, Cambodia	6th	5	0	0	5	0	72
2025	Bangkok, Thailand	5th	4	0	0	4	1	49
