= 2022 Men's Indoor Hockey Asia Cup =

Tournament details
- Host country: Thailand
- City: Bangkok
- Dates: 8–15 August
- Teams: 7 (from 1 confederation)
- Venue: Indoor Stadium Huamark

Final positions
- Champions: Malaysia (1st title)
- Runner-up: Iran
- Third place: Kazakhstan

Tournament statistics
- Matches played: 24
- Goals scored: 187 (7.79 per match)
- Top scorer: (Iran) Amirmahdi Mirzakhani (13 goals)

The 2022 Men's Indoor Hockey Asia Cup was the ninth edition of the Men's Indoor Hockey Asia Cup, the biennial international men's indoor hockey championship of Asia organized by the Asian Hockey Federation. It was held alongside the women's tournament held at the Indoor Stadium Huamark in Bangkok, Thailand from 8 to 15 August 2022.

Iran were the defending champions, winning all previous editions but were ultimately defeated by Malaysia by tieing up 4–4 but losing 3–2 in the shootouts making Malaysia the first team other than Iran to win a title at the Men's Indoor Hockey Asia Cup. Kazakhstan won the bronze medal after defeating Indonesia 5–4.

== Teams ==
Team	FIH Indoor World Rankings	Appearance	Last Appearance	Previous best performance
Chinese Taipei	Not ranked	5th	2019	4th (2014)
Indonesia	Not ranked	2nd	2014	5th (2014)
Iran	3	9th	2019	1st (2008, 2009, 2010, 2012, 2014, 2015, 2017, 2019)
Kazakhstan	13	7th	2019	2nd (2015, 2017, 2019)
Malaysia	21	8th	2019	2nd (2008, 2009, 2010, 2014)
Singapore	33	3rd	2019	5th (2008)
Thailand	26	7th	2019	4th (2012)

== Preliminary round ==
=== Standings ===
Pos	Team	Pld	W	D	L	GF	GA	GD	Pts	Qualification
1	Iran	6	6	0	0	43	9	+34	18	Final
2	Malaysia	6	3	2	1	26	8	+18	11	Final
3	Indonesia	6	3	2	1	31	19	+12	11	Third place match
4	Kazakhstan	6	3	2	1	25	14	+11	11	Third place match
5	Thailand (H)	6	2	0	4	19	32	−13	6	Fifth place match
6	Chinese Taipei	6	1	0	5	12	43	−31	3	Fifth place match
7	Singapore	6	0	0	6	3	34	−31	0	

Source: FIH
Rules for classification: 1) points; 2) matches won; 3) goal difference; 4) goals for; 5) head-to-head result; 6) field goals for.
(H) Hosts

=== Matches ===
8 August 2022
12:15

Kazakhstan	4–4	Indonesia
Urmanov Daulet 26', 34'; Dyussebekov Yerkebulan 30'; Alment Talant 33'	Report	Alfiana Muhamad 12', 24'; Prawesti Candra 14', 15'

Umpires:
van Bunge Coen (Netherlands)
Wang Sunny (Singapore)

8 August 2022
17:00

Malaysia	6–0	Singapore
Mohd Farizul 16', 23'; Mohd Hazemi Razali 25'; Hanafiah Aslam 29'; Silverius Shello 32'; Samantri Norsyafiq 36'	Report

Umpires:
Subboonsong Narongtuch (Thailand)
Salman (Indonesia)

8 August 2022
19:30

Thailand	5–1	Chinese Taipei
Sukwong Pongpon 5'; Yodsaeng Anucha 9', 12', 28'; Trongthaisong Thoranin 32'	Report	Shih Chung-Po 12'

Umpires:
Karupusamy Lingam (Malaysia)
Urmanov Makhsudbek (Kazakhstan)

9 August 2022
13:30

Malaysia	12–2	Chinese Taipei
Jazlan Nazmi 5', 31'; Hanafiah Aslam 6', 38', 39'; Mohd Farizul 14', 40'; Silverius Shello 22', 36'; Mohd Hazemi Razali 29'; Azhar Muhammad 34', 37'	Report	Tsai Chang-Yu 28'; Hsieh Tsung-Yu 36'

Umpires:
Kodama Shigeki (Japan)
Niensupornphand Phiraphat (Thailand)

9 August 2022
17:00

Kazakhstan	6–1	Singapore
Urmanov Daulet 4', 9'; Dyussebekov Yerkebulan 8', 19'; Yelubayev Aman 16', 32'	Report	Ng Nicholas 10'

Umpires:
Golgoun Alireza (Iran)
Subboonsong Narongtuch (Thailand)

9 August 2022
19:30

Iran	5–2	Indonesia
Mirzakhani Amirmahdi 6', 8', 34', 35'; Shahrokhi Mahdi 19'	Report	Nugraha Fajar 16'; Asasi Ahdan 37'

Umpires:
Van Bunge Coen (Netherlands)
Chen Chu-Yen (Chinese Taipei)

10 August 2022
12:15

Iran	8–0	Singapore
Mirzakhani Amirmahdi 1', 18', 34', 35'; Karimi Mohammad 9', 27'; Nooranian Hamid 11'; Asnaashari Mohammad 40'	Report

Umpires:
Urmanov Makhsudbek (Kazakhstan)
Niensupornphand Phiraphat (Thailand)

10 August 2022
14:45

Kazakhstan	5–1	Chinese Taipei
Urmanov Daulet 1', 38'; Yelubayev Aman 10', 12'; Dyussebekov Yerkebulan 11'	Report	Hsieh Tsung-Yu 32'

Umpires:
Karupusamy Lingam (Malaysia)
Subboonsong Narongtuch (Thailand)

10 August 2022
18:15

Malaysia	5–0	Thailand
Jazlan Najmi 15', 35'; Sumantri Norsyafiq 21', 34'; Mohd Faridzul 28'	Report

Umpires:
Salman (Indonesia)
Wang Sunny (Singapore)

11 August 2022
12:15

Singapore	2–5	Indonesia
Mayazhagu Guhan 24'; Abdul Rashid Muhammad Shafiq 33'	Report	Alfiana Muhamad 8', 33'; Firdaus Muhammad 18'; Guntara Andrea 20'; Prawesti Candra 26'

Umpires:
Karupusamy Lingam (Malaysia)
Chen Chu-Yen (Chinese Taipei)

11 August 2022
14:45

Iran	11–1	Chinese Taipei
Nooranian Hamid 6', 23', 35'; Karimi Mohammad 8', 12', 40'; Mirzakhani Amirmahdi 13'; Shahrokhi Mahdi 19'; Ghoreishiroudbaraki Seyedmohammad 28', 31'; Bohlouli Mohsen 36'	Report	Hsieh Tsung-Yu 36'

Umpires:
Kodama Shigeki (Japan)
Wang Sunny (Singapore)

11 August 2022
18:15

Kazakhstan	6–3	Thailand
Urmanov Daulet 4'; Duisengazy Agymtay 10', 19'; Yelubayev Aman 30'; Dyussebekov Yerkebulan 32', 34'	Report	Ketsawad Nichanon 25', 25'; Sori Kittithat 35'

Umpires:
Van Bunge Coen (Netherlands)
Golgoun Alireza (Iran)

12 August 2022
13:30

Chinese Taipei	4–0	Singapore
Shih Chung-Po 18', 29'; Yu Shih-Chieh 34', 38'	Report

Umpires:
Urmanov Makhsudbek (Kazakhstan)
Salman (Indonesia)

12 August 2022
17:00

Iran	3–0	Malaysia
Shahrokhi Mahdi 5'; Asnaashari Mohammad 18'; Nooranian Hamid 35'	Report

Umpires:
Van Bunge Coen (Belanda)
Subboonsong Narongtuch (Thailand)

12 August 2022
19:30

Thailand	3–8	Indonesia
Sori Kittithat 18', 24'; A-nukoon Warawut 35'	Report	Priliandro Revo 6'; Alfiana Muhamad 9', 20'; Asasi Ahdan 16'; Prawesti Candra 26'; Firdaus Muhammad 31'; Santoso Prima 31', 32'

Umpires:
Kodama Shigeki (Japan)
Karupusamy Lingam (Malaysia)

13 August 2022
12:30

Iran	4–3	Kazakhstan
Ghoreishiroudbaraki Seyedmohammad 8'; Shahrokhi Mahdi 13', 28'; Nooranian Hamid 36'	Report	Dyussebekov Yerkebulan 11'; Urmanov Daulet 20'; Duisengazy Agymtay 25'

Umpires:
Karupusamy Lingam (Malaysia)
Kodama Shigeki (Japan)

13 August 2022
15:30

Malaysia	2–2	Indonesia
Omar Firdaus 12'; Hamsani Ashran 20'	Report	Alfiana Muhamad 10'; Santoso Prima 24'

Umpires:
Urmanov Makhsudbek (Kazakhstan)
Niensupornphand Phiraphat (Thailand)

13 August 2022
18:30

Thailand	5–0	Singapore
Sukwong Pongpon 6'; A-nukoon Warawut 9', 11', 22', 24'	Report

Umpires:
CHEN Chu-Yen (Chinese Taipei)
Golgoun Alireza (Iran)

14 August 2022
12:30

Chinese Taipei	3–10	Indonesia
Hsieh Tsung-Yu 33', 34', 40'	Report	Alfiana Muhamad 2', 23', 30'; Santoso Prima 7', 34', 36'; Guntara Andrea 17'; Firdaus Muhammad 21'; Rahman Ferdian 31', 38'; Santoso Prima 7', 34', 36'

Umpires:
Golgoun Alireza (Iran)
Niensupornphand Phiraphat (Thailand)

14 August 2022
15:30

Kazakhstan	1–1	Malaysia
Urmanov Daulet 30+'	Report	Hanafiah Aslam 22'

Umpires:
Wang Sunny (Singapore)
Salman (Indonesia)

14 August 2022
18:30

Iran	12–3	Thailand
Asnaashari Mohammad 1'; Lashgari Payam 2', 38'; Mirzakhani Amirmahdi 6'; Shahrokhi Mahdi 11', FG'; Ghoreishiroudbaraki Seyedmohammad 27'; Mamizadeh Sajjad 30'; Ebadifar Reza 31'	Report	AYodsaeng Anucha 6', 35'; Noonee Jarernchai 12'

Umpires:
Urmanov Makhsudbek (Kazakhstan)
Chen Chu-Yen (Chinese Taipei)

== Classification round ==
=== Fifth place match ===
15 August 2022
12:30

Thailand	7–4	Chinese Taipei
Ketsawad Nichanon 16'; A-Nukoon Warawut 17', 36'; Yodsaeng Anucha 21'; Suyaram Anuson 26'	Report	Yu Chien-Feng 11', 20'; Yu Shih-Chieh 14'

Umpires:
Salman (Indonesia)
Wang Sunny (Singapore)

=== Third place match ===
15 August 2022
14:00

Indonesia	4–5	Kazakhstan
Santoso Prima 13'; Prawesti Candra 24'; Alfiana Muhamad 37', 39'	Report	Urmanov Daulet 15'; Yelubayev Aman 20'; Dyussebekov Yerkebulan 23'; Duisengazy Agymtay 37'

Umpires:
Karupusamy Lingam (Malaysia)
Kodama Shigeki (Japan)

=== Final ===
15 August 2022
17:00

Iran	4–4	Malaysia
Bohlouli Mohsen 2'; Mirzakhani Amirmahdi 19'; Karimi Mohammad 31'; Nooranian Hamid 37'	Report	Hamsani Ashran 11'; Silverius Shello 15'; Jamil Azomi Norhafizie 25'; Hamsani Ashran 35'
Penalties
Bohlouli Mohsen (penalty shoot-out scored); Shahrokhi Mahdi (penalty shoot-out missed); Mirzakhani Amirmahdi (penalty shoot-out scored)	2–3	Silverius Shello (penalty shoot-out scored); Sumantri Norsyafiq (penalty shoot-out scored); Azhar Muhammad (penalty shoot-out scored)

Umpires:
Subboonsong Narongtuch (Thailand)
Coen van Bunge (Netherlands)

== Final standing ==
Rank	Team	Record
1st place, gold medalist(s)	Malaysia	4-2-1
2nd place, silver medalist(s)	Iran	6-0-1
3rd place, bronze medalist(s)	Kazakhstan	4-2-1
4	Indonesia	3-2-2
5	Thailand	3-0-4
6	Chinese Taipei	1-0-6
7	Singapore	0-0-6

== See also ==
- 2022 Men's Hockey Asia Cup
- 2022 Women's Indoor Hockey Asia Cup
