= Indoor hockey at the 2019 SEA Games – Men's tournament =

Men's indoor hockey at the 2019 SEA Games
Tournament details
- Host country: Philippines
- City: Los Baños
- Dates: 4–10 December
- Teams: 5 (from 1 confederation)
- Venue: Centro Mall

Final positions
- Champions: Malaysia (2nd title)
- Runner-up: Thailand

Tournament statistics
- Matches played: 13
- Goals scored: 62 (4.77 per match)
- Top scorer(s): (Malaysia) Najmi Jazlan (Thailand) Thanop Kampanthong (7 goals)

The men's team tournament for indoor hockey at the 2019 SEA Games in Philippines were held from 4 to 10 December 2019 at LB Centro Mall & Convention Center.

== Squads ==
Malaysia (MAS)	Myanmar (MYA)	Philippines (PHI)	Singapore (SGP)	Thailand (THA)
Mohd Hanip Che Halim; Muhammad Najmi Farizal Jazlan; Muhammad Amirol Aideed Mohd Arshad; Mohd Khairul Afendy Kamaruzaman; Muhammad Aslam Mohamed Hanafiah; Rafizul Ezry Mustafa; Mohfaiz Hazrul Ahmad Sobri; Mohd Shafiq Yaacob; Muhammad Firdaus Omar; Shello Silverius; Muhamad Aminudin Mohd Zain; Shazril Irwan Nazli	Than Htut Win; Maung Hein; Thet Htwe; Thein Htike Oo; Ko Ko Lin; Ko Wai; Nay Shane; Sit Nyein Aye; Thein Htike Aung; Aung Myo Thu; Sa Kaung Htet; Kyaw Ye Htut	Marvin Lianza; Rolly Bustamante; Sherwinson Casapao; John El Guinto; Arvin Villagomez; Teofilo Alfieri Agostino; Luther John Contredas; Jhunar Rei Forio; Jonas Kenneth Gonzales; Juncent CJ Marasigan; Celfin Naz; Kyle Ronniel Lanting	Muhammad Shafiq Abdul Rashid; Muhammad Hidayat Mat Rahim; Guhan Mayazhagu; Abdul Rahim Abdul Rashid; Aik Yu Chen; Mohammed Sabri Yuhari; Grewal Ishwarpal Singh; Mohamed Rifqi Mohamed Rafik Alkhatib; Muhammad Zafir bin Mohamad Nasir; Tan Yi Ru; Timothy Goh Kai Yang; Karuppiah Arasu CT	Ratthawit Khamkong; Noppadon Phaosong; Thanop Kampanthong; Peerapat Thuktham; Wiros Yosiri; Warun Boonpea; Thoranin Trongthaisong; Warawut Anukoon; Wallop Khamwong; Thanawat Wiyaboon; Charoenchai Noonee; Thaworn Sooknakin

== Results ==
=== Group stage ===
Pos	Team	Pld	W	D	L	GF	GA	GD	Pts	Qualification
1	Malaysia	4	4	0	0	19	0	+19	12	Semi-finals
2	Thailand	4	2	1	1	10	4	+6	7	Semi-finals
3	Singapore	4	2	1	1	8	10	−2	7	Semi-finals
4	Myanmar	4	1	0	3	6	14	−8	3	Semi-finals
5	Philippines (H)	4	0	0	4	2	17	−15	0	

Source: FIH
(H) Hosts

4 December 2019
14:15

Thailand	4–1	Myanmar
	Report

Umpires:
Lukasz Zwierzchowski (POL)
Christian Galicia (PHI)

4 December 2019
17:45

Singapore	4–1	Philippines
	Report

Umpires:
Tomas Holek (CZE)
Narongtuch Subboonsung (THA)

5 December 2019
16:00

Malaysia	6–0	Myanmar
	Report

Umpires:
Tomas Holek (CZE)
Narongtuch Subboonsung (THA)

5 December 2019
19:30

Thailand	5–0	Philippines
	Report

Umpires:
Salan Ayob (SGP)
Fakaruddin Azieh (MAS)

6 December 2019
16:00

Singapore	0–6	Malaysia
	Report

Umpires:
Lukasz Zwierzchowski (POL)
Narongtuch Subboonsung (THA)

6 December 2019
19:30

Philippines	1–3	Myanmar
	Report

Umpires:
Salan Ayob (SGP)
Fakaruddin Azieh (MAS)

7 December 2019
14:15

Thailand	0–2	Malaysia
	Report

Umpires:
Tomas Holek (CZE)
Salan Ayob (SGP)

7 December 2019
17:45

Myanmar	2–3	Singapore
	Report

Umpires:
Lukasz Zwierzchowski (POL)
Christian Galicia (PHI)

8 December 2019
16:00

Singapore	1–1	Thailand
	Report

Umpires:
Tomas Holek (CZE)
Fakaruddin Azieh (MAS)

8 December 2019
19:30

Malaysia	5–0	Philippines
	Report

Umpires:
Narongtuch Subboonsung (THA)
Lukasz Zwierzchowski (POL)

=== Medal round ===
Semi-finals
9 December
Thailand	5
Singapore	1
9 December
Malaysia	7
Myanmar	0

Final
10 December
Thailand	1
Malaysia	3

==== Semi-finals ====
9 December 2019
15:30

Thailand	5–1	Singapore
	Report

Umpires:
Tomas Holek (CZE)
Fakaruddin Azieh (MAS)

9 December 2019
17:30

Malaysia	7–0	Myanmar
	Report

Umpires:
Lukasz Zwierzchowski (POL)
Narongtuch Subboonsung (THA)

==== Final ====
10 December 2019
19:30

Thailand	1–3	Malaysia
	Report

Umpires:
Tomas Holek (CZE)
Lukasz Zwierzchowski (POL)

== Final standings ==
Rank	Team
1st place, gold medalist(s)	Malaysia
2nd place, silver medalist(s)	Thailand
3rd place, bronze medalist(s)	Myanmar
3rd place, bronze medalist(s)	Singapore
5	Philippines

== See also ==
- Indoor hockey at the 2019 SEA Games – Women's tournament
