= Philippines women's national indoor hockey team =

Philippines
- Association: Philippine Hockey Association
- Confederation: AHF (Asia)

FIH ranking
- Current: NR (January 2026)

Asia Cup
- Appearances: 1 (first in 2019)
- Best result: 9th (2019)

The Philippines women's national indoor hockey team represents the Philippines in women's international indoor hockey and is controlled by the Philippine Hockey Association.

== History ==
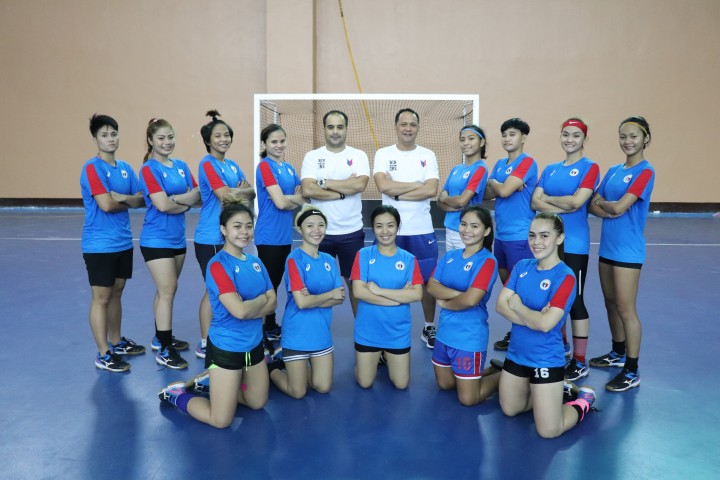
The national team in 2019.

The Philippines women's national indoor hockey team was formed six months prior to the start of the 2017 SEA Games in Malaysia in August. The initial squad was formed from college sportspeople who played volleyball, athletics, football, and taekwondo. It was the first time that indoor hockey was introduced in the regional games.

They made their debut, and so far their only appearance at the Women's Indoor Hockey Asia Cup in the 2019 edition in Thailand.

At the 2019 SEA Games at home, the Philippines advanced to the semifinals after winning one game against Cambodia. The team finished as bronze medalists after being eliminated by Malaysia in the semifinals.

The Philippines subsequently took part in the 2023 and 2025 editions in Cambodia and Thailand respectively.

== Records ==
=== Asian Cup ===
Asia Cup record
Year	Host	Position	Pld	W	D	L	GF	GA
2019	Chonburi, Thailand	9th	5	0	1	4	3	30
2022	Bangkok, Thailand	Did not enter						
2024	Chonburi, Thailand	Did not enter						

=== SEA Games ===
SEA Games record
Year	Host	Position	Pld	W	D	L	GF	GA
2017	Segambut, Malaysia	5th	4	0	0	4	0	49
2019	Los Baños, Philippines	3rd	5	1	0	4	4	40
2023	Phnom Penh, Cambodia	6th	5	0	0	5	2	46
2025	Bangkok, Thailand	5th	4	0	0	4	1	18
