= 2017 Women's Indoor Hockey Asia Cup =

2017 Women's Indoor Asia Cup
Tournament details
- Host country: Qatar
- City: Doha
- Dates: 24–28 April
- Teams: 6 (from 1 confederation)

Final positions
- Champions: Kazakhstan (5th title)
- Runner-up: Malaysia
- Third place: Thailand

Tournament statistics
- Matches played: 18
- Goals scored: 157 (8.72 per match)
- Top scorer: (Uzbekistan) Kamila Adizova (14 goals)

The 2017 Women's Indoor Asia Cup was the sixth edition of the Women's Indoor Hockey Asia Cup. It was held in Doha, Qatar from 24–28 April 2017.

The number of teams for this year’s cup wasincreased by one compared to the previous tournament where five teams competed. Cambodia and Hong Kong, who competed previously, not joined this year’s edition and be replaced by Malaysia, North Korea, and China.

Kazakhstan defeated Malaysia in the final to win the cup and secured a place in 2018 Women's Indoor Hockey World Cup.

== Participating nations ==
Six countries participated in this year's tournament:

Team	FIH Indoor World Ranking	Appearance	Last appearance	Previous best performance
China	Not ranked	1st	None	Debut
Kazakhstan	12	6th	2015	1st (2010, 2012, 2014, 2015)
Malaysia	26	5th	2014	1st (2009)
North Korea	Not ranked	1st	None	Debut
Thailand	32	6th	2015	2nd (2010, 2012, 2015)
Uzbekistan	35	5th	2015	3rd (2009, 2015)

== Umpires ==
1. Frances Block (ENG)
2. Emily Carroll (AUS)
3. Hafizah Azman Nor (MAS)
4. Thanittha Chuangmanichot (THA)
5. Zarina Ilyassova (KAZ)
6. Ornpimol Kittiteerasopon (THA)
7. Weizhen Leong (SIN)

== Results ==
All times are in Qatar Standard Time (UTC+03:00).

=== Pool ===
Pos	Team	Pld	W	D	L	GF	GA	GD	Pts	Qualification
1	Kazakhstan	5	4	1	0	25	6	+19	13	Final
2	Malaysia	5	3	1	1	27	11	+16	10	Final
3	Thailand	5	3	0	2	26	7	+19	9	Third place game
4	North Korea	5	2	0	3	28	16	+12	6	Third place game
5	Uzbekistan	5	1	2	2	25	17	+8	5	Fifth place game
6	China	5	0	0	5	0	74	−74	0	Fifth place game

Source: FIH

24 April 2017
11:15

Thailand	3–1	Uzbekistan
	Report

Umpires:
Frances Block (ENG)
Emily Carroll (AUS)

24 April 2017
12:30

Malaysia	15–0	China
	Report

Umpires:
Ornpimol Kittiteerasopon (THA)
Zarina Ilyassova (KAZ)

24 April 2017
13:45

Kazakhstan	5–2	North Korea
	Report

Umpires:
Thanittha Chuangmanichot (THA)
Hafizah Azman Nor (MAS)

24 April 2017
17:30

Malaysia	3–3	Uzbekistan
	Report

Umpires:
Frances Block (ENG)
Weizhen Leong (SIN)

25 April 2017
11:15

Kazakhstan	11–0	China
	Report

Umpires:
Ornpimol Kittiteerasopon (THA)
Weizhen Leong (SIN)

25 April 2017
12:30

North Korea	1–4	Thailand
	Report

Umpires:
Emily Carroll (AUS)
Hafizah Azman Nor (MAS)

25 April 2017
16:15

Uzbekistan	17–0	China
	Report

Umpires:
Thanittha Chuangmanichot (THA)
Zarina Ilyassova (KAZ)

25 April 2017
17:30

Thailand	0–3	Kazakhstan
	Report

Umpires:
Frances Block (ENG)
Emily Carroll (AUS)

26 April 2017
11:15

North Korea	3–5	Malaysia
	Report

Umpires:
Frances Block (ENG)
Ornpimol Kittiteerasopon (THA)

26 April 2017
16:15

China	0–18	Thailand
	Report

Umpires:
Hafizah Azman Nor (MAS)
Weizhen Leong (SIN)

26 April 2017
17:30

Uzbekistan	2–9	North Korea
	Report

Umpires:
Emily Carroll (AUS)
Thanittha Chuangmanichot (THA)

27 April 2017
10:00

Malaysia	2–4	Kazakhstan
	Report

Umpires:
Ornpimol Kittiteerasopon (THA)
Weizhen Leong (SIN)

27 April 2017
11:15

China	0–13	North Korea
	Report

Umpires:
Emily Carroll (AUS)
Zarina Ilyassova (KAZ)

27 April 2017
15:30

Kazakhstan	2–2	Uzbekistan
	Report

Umpires:
Hafizah Azman Nor (MAS)
Thanittha Chuangmanichot (THA)

27 April 2017
16:45

Thailand	1–2	Malaysia
	Report

Umpires:
Frances Block (ENG)
Emily Carroll (AUS)

=== Classification round ===
==== Fifth place game ====
28 April 2017
11:00

Uzbekistan	14–0	China
	Report

Umpires:
Thanittha Chuangmanichot (THA)
Weizhen Leong (SIN)

==== Third place game ====
28 April 2017
14:00

Thailand	5–5	North Korea
	Report
Penalties
	3–1

Umpires:
Emily Carroll (AUS)
Hafizah Azman Nor (MAS)

==== Final ====
28 April 2017
17:00

Kazakhstan	2–0	Malaysia
	Report

Umpires:
Frances Block (ENG)
Ornpimol Kittiteerasopon (THA)

== Final standings ==
Pos	Team	Qualification
1	Kazakhstan	2018 Indoor Hockey World Cup
2	Malaysia	
3	Thailand	
4	North Korea	
5	Uzbekistan	
6	China	

Source: FIH

== See also ==
- 2017 Men's Indoor Hockey Asia Cup
