= Indoor hockey at the 2017 SEA Games – Men's tournament =

Men's indoor hockey at the 2017 SEA Games
Tournament details
- Host country: Malaysia
- City: Segambut
- Dates: 21–26 August
- Teams: 6 (from 1 confederation)
- Venue: MATRADE Exhibition and Convention Centre

Final positions
- Champions: Malaysia (1st title)
- Runner-up: Indonesia
- Third place: Singapore

Tournament statistics
- Matches played: 18
- Goals scored: 143 (7.94 per match)
- Top scorer: (Malaysia) Najib Hassan (14 goals)

The men's indoor hockey tournament at the 2017 SEA Games was held from 21 to 26 August in Malaysia. In this tournament, 6 Southeast Asian teams played in the men's competition.

All matches were played at MATRADE Exhibition and Convention Centre in Segambut.

== Competition schedule ==
The following was the competition schedule for the men's indoor hockey competitions:

G	Group stage	PO	5th place play-off	B	3rd place play-off	F	Final

Mon 21	Tue 22	Wed 23	Thu 24	Fri 25	Sat 26		
G	G	G	G		PO	B	F

== Participating nations ==
The following six teams participated for the men's competition.

- Indonesia (INA)
- Malaysia (MAS)
- Philippines (PHI)
- Singapore (SGP)
- Thailand (THA)
- Vietnam (VIE)

== Draw ==
There was no official draw since only 6 teams participating in this competition. All teams are automatically drawn to one group.

== Results ==
- All times are Malaysia Standard Time (UTC+8).

=== Group stage ===
Pos	Team	Pld	W	D	L	GF	GA	GD	Pts	Qualification
1	Malaysia (H)	5	5	0	0	45	2	+43	15	Gold medal match
2	Indonesia	5	4	0	1	33	9	+24	12	Gold medal match
3	Thailand	5	3	0	2	33	10	+23	9	Bronze medal match
4	Singapore	5	2	0	3	10	9	+1	6	Bronze medal match
5	Vietnam	5	1	0	4	5	40	−35	3	Fifth place game
6	Philippines	5	0	0	5	2	58	−56	0	Fifth place game

Source: KL2017 Official Website
(H) Hosts

21 August 2017
10:30

Malaysia	16–0	Philippines
Najib Hassan 4', 31', 38'; Shafiq Yaacob 4', 14', 28', 40'; Hanip Che Halim 12'; Muhamad Shafiq Syed 16'; Irwan Nazli 18', 24'; Norsyafiq Sumantri 19', 37'; Muhammad Amirol Aideed 22'; Najmi Farizal 33'; Ashran Hamsani 40'	Report

Umpires:
Lee Barron (ENG)
Sunny Wang (SGP)

21 August 2017
13:30

Indonesia	11–0	Vietnam
Alvin Nourul 6'; Zaki Lukman 9', 17', 21', 33'; Iskandar Zulkarnaen Z.A. 12'; Candra Prawesti 15', 29', 39'; Daarul Quthni 18', 28'	Report

Umpires:
Mohd Zainal (MAS)
Narongtuch Subboonsung (THA)

21 August 2017
16:30

Thailand	3–1	Singapore
Warun Boonpea 18', 36'; Satianpong Kosuwan 28'	Report	Samuel Nee 17'

Umpires:
Raman Baskar (MAS)
Hassan Abazari (IRI)

21 August 2017
19:30

Malaysia	15–0	Vietnam
Norsyafiq Sumantri 5'; Najmi Farizal 7'; Ashran Hamsani 8'; Shafiq Yaacob 10', 18', 26', 36'; Najib Hassan 13', 18', 24', 31'; Muhamad Syafiq Syed 34'; Irwan Nazli 37', 40+'; Muhammad Amirol Aideed 39'	Report

Umpires:
Salman (INA)
Lee Barron (ENG)

22 August 2017
10:30

Indonesia	2–1	Singapore
Candra Prawesti 8'; Astri Rahmad 40'	Report	Muhammad Kanadi 38'

Umpires:
Hassan Abazari (IRI)
Narongtuch Subboonsong (THA)

22 August 2017
13:30

Philippines	1–17	Thailand
John-El Guinto 40'	Report	Thanop Kampanthong 2', 5', 12'; Warun Boonpea 4', 13', 14', 23', 35', 37'; Satianpong Kosuwan 9'; Thoranin Trongthaisong 20', 24', 32'; Thewakun Maiprasoet 27'; Ratthawit Khamkong 30'; Tanakoon Jongtavon 37'; Jutipong Indee 39'

Umpires:
Sunny Wang (SGP)
Mohd Zainal (MAS)

22 August 2017
16:30

Singapore	2–0	Vietnam
Muhammad Shafiq Abdul Rashid 20'; Rahim Abdul 25'	Report

Umpires:
Lee Barron (ENG)
Raman Baskar (MAS)

22 August 2017
19:30

Thailand	0–4	Malaysia
	Report	Muhammad Amirol Aideed 6'; Muhamad Syafiq Syed 35'; Najib Hassan 36'; Ashran Hamsani 38'

Umpires:
Salman (INA)
Hassan Abazari (IRI)

23 August 2017
10:30

Philippines	0–14	Indonesia
	Report	Zaki Lukman 2', 22'; Alvin Nourul 5'; Candra Prawesti 7', 8', 35'; Daarul Quthni 15'; Iskandar Zulkarnaen Z.A. 18'; Zein Hamdani 20'; Astri Rahmad 21', 23', 39'; Adit Juwantoro 33', 37'

Umpires:
Sunny Wang (SGP)
Raman Baskar (MAS)

23 August 2017
13:30

Vietnam	0–11	Thailand
	Report	Thanop Kampanthong 3', 24', 40'; Thaworn Sooknakin 8'; Tanakoon Jongtavon 9'; Warun Boonpea 18', 30', 32', 35', 39'; Satianpong Kosuwan 20+'

Umpires:
Hassan Abazari (IRI)
Salman (INA)

23 August 2017
16:30

Singapore	6–0	Philippines
Ishwarpal Singh Grewal 9', 27'; Goh Kai Yang 23'; Muhammad Shafiq Abdul Rashid 32'; Muhammad Basir 33'; Rahim Abdul 40+'	Report

Umpires:
Narongtuch Subboonsong (THA)
Mohd Zainal (MAS)

23 August 2017
19:30

Indonesia	2–6	Malaysia
Zaki Lukman 8'; Astri Rahmad 36'	Report	Norsyafiq Sumantri 2', 40'; Shafiq Yaacob 6'; Najib Hassan 30', 40'; Muhamad Syafiq Syed 32'

Umpires:
Narongtuch Subboonsong (THA)
Lee Barron (ENG)

24 August 2017
12:00

Vietnam	5–1	Philippines
Nguyen Thein Nhat Nghia 6', 36'; Tran Ngoc Khoa 12', 23'; Huynh Dai Phuc 39'	Report	Marvin Lianza 38'

Umpires:
Sunny Wang (SGP)
Mohd Zainal (MAS)

24 August 2017
13:30

Thailand	2–4	Indonesia
Satianpong Kosuwan 28'; Peerapat Thuktam 34'	Report	Alvin Nourul 20', 31'; Zaki Lukman 36'; Adit Juwantoro 37'

Umpires:
Barron Lee (ENG)
Hassan Abazari (IRI)

24 August 2017
19:30

Malaysia	4–0	Singapore
Shafiq Yaacob 8'; Najib Hassan 20', 24', 27'	Report

Umpires:
Narongtuch Subboonsong (THA)
Salman (INA)

=== Classification round ===
==== Fifth place game ====
26 August 2017
14:00

Vietnam	7–0	Philippines
Huynh Dai Phuc 7'; Ly Kim Long 15', 17'; Tran Ngoc Khoa 16'; Le Mai Quyen 25'; Nguyen Thein Nhat Nghia 27', 38'	Report

Umpires:
Raman Baskar (MAS)
Mohd Zainal (MAS)

==== Bronze medal match ====
26 August 2017
16:00

Thailand	1–1	Singapore
Satianpong Kosuwan 30'	Report	Goh Kai Yang 31'
Penalties
Ratthawit Khamkong (penalty shoot-out scored); Jutipong Indee (penalty shoot-out missed)	1-3	(penalty shoot-out scored) Goh Kai Yang; (penalty shoot-out scored) Muhammad Mat Rahim; (penalty shoot-out scored) Muhammad Shafiq Abdul Rashid

Umpires:
Salman (INA)
Hassan Abazari(IRI)

==== Gold medal match ====
26 August 2017
18:00

Malaysia	5–1	Indonesia
Shafiq Yaacob 4'; Irwan Nazli 19'; Najib Hassan 23'; Muhamad Syafiq Syed 25'; Muhammad Amirol Aideed 39'	Report	Alvin Nourul 38'

Umpires:
Lee Barron (ENG)
Narongtuch Subboonsong (THA)

== Final standings ==
1. Malaysia
2. Indonesia
3. Singapore
4. Thailand
5. Vietnam
6. Philippines

== See also ==
- Indoor hockey at the 2017 SEA Games – Women's tournament
