= Men's Indoor Hockey Asia Cup =

Men's Indoor Asia Cup
- Most recent season or competition: 2024 Men's Indoor Hockey Asia Cup
- Sport: Indoor hockey
- Founded: 2008; 18 years ago
- Confederation: AHF (Asia)
- Most recent champion: Iran (9th title) (2024)
- Most titles: Iran (9 titles)

The Men's Indoor Hockey Asia Cup is an international men's indoor hockey competition organized by the Asian Hockey Federation. The winning team becomes the champion of Asia. The tournament serves as a qualification tournament for the Indoor Hockey World Cup.

== Results ==
#	Year	Host	Final			Third place match			Teams
#	Year	Host	Winner	Score	Runner-up	Third place	Score	Fourth place	Teams
1	2008; Details	Ipoh, Malaysia	Iran	3–2	Malaysia	Uzbekistan	5–2	Malaysia B	6
2	2009; Details	Ipoh, Malaysia	Iran	3–2	Malaysia	Uzbekistan	6–2	Malaysia B	5
3	2010; Details	Ipoh, Malaysia	Iran	3–2	Malaysia	Uzbekistan	2–0	Pakistan	6
4	2012; Details	Saraburi, Thailand	Iran	8–0	Uzbekistan	Malaysia	5–2	Thailand	7
5	2014; Details	Changhua, Taiwan	Iran	5–1	Malaysia	Kazakhstan	3–2	Chinese Taipei	5
6	2015; Details	Taldykorgan, Kazakhstan	Iran	9–2	Kazakhstan	Uzbekistan	5–3	Qatar	5
7	2017; Details	Doha, Qatar	Iran	10–1	Kazakhstan	Qatar	5–3	Uzbekistan	8
8	2019; Details	Chonburi, Thailand	Iran	10–0	Kazakhstan	Malaysia	6–3	Uzbekistan	10
9	2022; Details	Bangkok, Thailand	Malaysia	4–4 (3–2 s.o.)	Iran	Kazakhstan	5–4	Indonesia	7
10	2024; Details	Taldykorgan, Kazakhstan	Iran	7–1	Malaysia	Kazakhstan	7–2	Thailand	8

== Medal table ==
Rank	Nation	Gold	Silver	Bronze	Total
1	Iran	9	1	0	10
2	Malaysia	1	5	2	8
3	Kazakhstan	0	3	3	6
4	Uzbekistan	0	1	4	5
5	Qatar	0	0	1	1
Totals (5 entries)		10	10	10	30

== Team appearances ==
Nation	(Malaysia) 2008	(Malaysia) 2009	(Malaysia) 2010	(Thailand) 2012	(Chinese Taipei) 2014	(Kazakhstan) 2015	(Qatar) 2017	(Thailand) 2019	(Thailand) 2022	(Kazakhstan) 2024	Total
Bangladesh	–	–	–	–	–	–	–	7th	–	–	1
Chinese Taipei	–	–	–	5th	4th	–	8th	8th	6th	–	5
Indonesia	–	–	–	–	5th	–	–	–	4th	5th	3
Iran	1st	1st	1st	1st	1st	1st	1st	1st	2nd	1st	10
Kazakhstan	–	–	6th	6th	3rd	2nd	2nd	2nd	3rd	3rd	8
Kazakhstan B	–	–	–	–	–	6th	–	–	–	–	1
Malaysia	2nd	2nd	2nd	3rd	2nd	–	5th	3rd	1st	2nd	9
Malaysia B	4th	4th	–	–	–	–	–	–	–	–	2
Nepal	–	–	–	–	–	–	–	9th	–	–	1
Oman	–	–	–	–	–	–	6th	–	–	6th	2
Pakistan	–	–	4th	–	–	–	–	–	–	–	1
Philippines	–	–	–	–	–	–	–	10th	–	–	1
Qatar	–	–	–	–	–	4th	3rd	–	–	–	2
Singapore	5th	–	–	–	–	–	–	6th	7th	7th	4
Tajikistan	–	–	–	–	–	5th	–	–	–	8th	2
Thailand	6th	5th	5th	4th	–	–	7th	5th	5th	4th	8
Thailand B	–	–	–	7th	–	–	–	–	–	–	1
Uzbekistan	3rd	3rd	3rd	2nd	–	3rd	4th	4th	–	–	7
Total (18)	6	5	6	7	5	6	8	10	7	8	

== See also ==
- Indoor hockey at the Asian Indoor and Martial Arts Games
- Men's Hockey Asia Cup
- Women's Indoor Hockey Asia Cup
