= Women's Indoor Hockey Asia Cup =

Women's Indoor Asia Cup
- Most recent season or competition: 2024 Women's Indoor Hockey Asia Cup
- Sport: Indoor hockey
- Founded: 2009; 17 years ago
- No. of teams: 10
- Confederation: AHF (Asia)
- Most recent champion: Thailand (2nd title) (2024)
- Most titles: Kazakhstan (6 titles)

The Women's Indoor Hockey Asia Cup is an international women's indoor hockey competition organized by the Asian Hockey Federation. The winning team becomes the champion of Asia. The tournament serves as a qualification tournament for the Women's Indoor Hockey World Cup.

The first edition was held in 2009.

== Results ==
| # | Year | Host | Final | | | Third place match | | | Teams |
| # | Year | Host | Winner | Score | Runner-up | Third place | Score | Fourth place | Teams |
|---|---|---|---|---|---|---|---|---|---|
| 1 | 2009; Details | Ipoh, Malaysia | Malaysia | 3–1 | Kazakhstan | Uzbekistan | 5–2 | Iran | 6 |
| 2 | 2010; Details | Bangkok, Thailand | Kazakhstan | 4–1 | Thailand | Malaysia | 6–1 | Uzbekistan | 5 |
| 3 | 2012; Details | Saraburi, Thailand | Kazakhstan | 2–1 | Thailand | Malaysia | 5–3 | Uzbekistan | 7 |
| 4 | 2014; Details | Taldykorgan, Kazakhstan | Kazakhstan | 5–1 | Malaysia | Thailand | 10–0 | Tajikistan | 4 |
| 5 | 2015; Details | Nakhon Ratchasima, Thailand | Kazakhstan | 4–2 | Thailand | Uzbekistan | 2–1 | Hong Kong | 5 |
| 6 | 2017; Details | Doha, Qatar | Kazakhstan | 2–0 | Malaysia | Thailand | 5–5 (3–1 s.o.) | North Korea | 6 |
| 7 | 2019; Details | Chonburi, Thailand | Kazakhstan | 3–1 | Thailand | Uzbekistan | 1–1 (1–0 s.o.) | Malaysia | 9 |
| 8 | 2022; Details | Bangkok, Thailand | Thailand | 2–1 | Indonesia | Malaysia | 2–0 | Kazakhstan | 9 |
| 9 | 2024; Details | Chonburi, Thailand | Thailand | 6–2 | Kazakhstan | Malaysia | 4–0 | Indonesia | 9 |

== Medal table ==
| Rank | Nation | Gold | Silver | Bronze | Total |
|---|---|---|---|---|---|
| 1 | Kazakhstan | 6 | 2 | 0 | 8 |
| 2 | Thailand | 2 | 4 | 2 | 8 |
| 3 | Malaysia | 1 | 2 | 4 | 7 |
| 4 | Indonesia | 0 | 1 | 0 | 1 |
| 5 | Uzbekistan | 0 | 0 | 3 | 3 |
| Totals (5 entries) | | 9 | 9 | 9 | 27 |

== Team appearances ==
| Nation | (Malaysia) 2009 | (Thailand) 2010 | (Thailand) 2012 | (Kazakhstan) 2014 | (Thailand) 2015 | (Qatar) 2017 | (Thailand) 2019 | (Thailand) 2022 | (Thailand) 2024 | Total |
|---|---|---|---|---|---|---|---|---|---|---|
| Cambodia | – | – | 7th | – | 5th | – | – | 8th | 6th | 4 |
| China | – | – | – | – | – | 6th | – | – | – | 1 |
| Chinese Taipei | – | – | 6th | – | – | – | 5th | 6th | – | 3 |
| Hong Kong | – | – | – | – | 4th | – | – | – | – | 1 |
| Indonesia | – | 5th | – | – | – | – | – | 2nd | 4th | 3 |
| Iran | 4th | – | 5th | – | – | – | 6th | 5th | 5th | 5 |
| Kazakhstan | 2nd | 1st | 1st | 1st | 1st | 1st | 1st | 4th | 2nd | 9 |
| Malaysia | 1st | 3rd | 3rd | 2nd | – | 2nd | 4th | 3rd | 3rd | 8 |
| Malaysia B | 6th | – | – | – | – | – | – | – | – | 1 |
| Nepal | – | – | – | – | – | – | 7th | – | WD | 2 |
| North Korea | – | – | – | – | – | 4th | – | – | – | 1 |
| Oman | – | – | – | – | – | – | – | – | 8th | 1 |
| Pakistan | – | – | – | – | – | – | – | 9th | – | 1 |
| Philippines | – | – | – | – | – | – | 9th | – | – | 1 |
| Singapore | – | – | – | – | – | – | 8th | 7th | 7th | 3 |
| Tajikistan | – | – | – | 4th | – | – | – | – | – | 1 |
| Thailand | 5th | 2nd | 2nd | 3rd | 2nd | 3rd | 2nd | 1st | 1st | 8 |
| Uzbekistan | 3rd | 4th | 4th | – | 3rd | 5th | 3rd | – | – | 6 |
| Vietnam | – | – | – | – | – | – | – | – | 9th | 1 |
| Total (19) | 6 | 5 | 7 | 4 | 5 | 6 | 9 | 9 | 9 | |

== See also ==
- Indoor hockey at the Asian Indoor and Martial Arts Games
- Men's Indoor Hockey Asia Cup
- Women's Hockey Asia Cup
