= 2015 Women's Indoor Hockey Asia Cup =

Tournament details
- Host country: Thailand
- City: Nakhon Ratchasima
- Dates: 12 August 2015–16 August 2015
- Teams: 5

Final positions
- Champions: Kazakhstan
- Runner-up: Thailand
- Third place: Uzbekistan

Tournament statistics
- Matches played: 12
- Goals scored: 67 (5.58 per match)
- Top scorer: (Kazakhstan) Natalya Gataulina (8 goals)

The 2015 Women's Indoor Asia Cup was the 5th edition of the Women's Indoor Hockey Asia Cup. It was held in Nakhon Ratchasima, Thailand from 12 to 16 August 2015.

The number of teams for this year's cup had increased by one compared to the previous tournament where four teams competed. Malaysia and Tajikistan, who competed previously, not joined this year's edition and be replaced by Cambodia, Hong Kong and Uzbekistan.

Kazakhstan defeated Thailand in the final to win the cup.

== Participating nations ==
Five countries participated in this year's tournament:

- Thailand (Host)
- Cambodia
- Hong Kong
- Kazakhstan
- Uzbekistan

== Umpires ==
1. Emily Carroll (AUS)
2. Annie Thomas (MAS)
3. Chan Ching Man (HKG)
4. Thanitta Chuangmanichot (THA)
5. Amina Dussembekova (KAZ)
6. Ornpimol Kittiteerasopon (THA)

== Results ==
All times are in Thailand Standard Time (UTC+07:00).

=== Pool ===
Pos	Team	Pld	W	D	L	GF	GA	GD	Pts	Qualification
1	Kazakhstan	4	4	0	0	20	1	+19	12	Final
2	Thailand (H)	4	2	1	1	13	5	+8	7	Final
3	Uzbekistan	4	1	2	1	11	6	+5	5	Third place game
4	Hong Kong	4	1	1	2	14	8	+6	4	Third place game
5	Cambodia	4	0	0	4	0	38	−38	0	

Updated to match(es) played on 15 August 2015. Source: FIH
(H) Hosts

12 August 2015
10:00

Uzbekistan	8–0	Cambodia
	Report

Umpires:
Ornpimol Kittiteerasopon (THA)
Thanitta Chuangmanichot (THA)

12 August 2015
11:15

Thailand	2–0	Hong Kong
	Report

Umpires:
Annie Thomas (MAS)
Amina Dussembekova (KAZ)

12 August 2015
17:00

Kazakhstan	5–1	Hong Kong
	Report

Umpires:
Ornpimol Kittiteerasopon (THA)
Emily Carroll (AUS)

12 August 2015
18:15

Thailand	9–0	Cambodia
	Report

Umpires:
Annie Thomas (MAS)
Chan Ching Man (HKG)

13 August 2015
17:00

Cambodia	0–12	Hong Kong
	Report

Umpires:
Thanitta Chuangmanichot (THA)
Amina Dussembekova (KAZ)

13 August 2015
18:15

Uzbekistan	0–3	Kazakhstan
	Report

Umpires:
Emily Carroll (AUS)
Chan Ching Man (HKG)

14 August 2015
17:00

Hong Kong	1–1	Uzbekistan
	Report

Umpires:
Thanitta Chuangmanichot (THA)
Ornpimol Kittiteerasopon (THA)

14 August 2015
18:15

Thailand	0–3	Kazakhstan
	Report

Umpires:
Annie Thomas (MAS)
Emily Carroll (AUS)

15 August 2015
10:00

Uzbekistan	2–2	Thailand
	Report

Umpires:
Emily Carroll (AUS)
Amina Dussembekova (KAZ)

15 August 2015
11:15

Kazakhstan	9–0	Cambodia
	Report

Umpires:
Chan Ching Man (HKG)
Annie Thomas (MAS)

=== Classification round ===
==== Third place game ====
16 August 2015
15:00

Uzbekistan	2–1	Hong Kong
	Report

Umpires:
Thanitta Chuangmanichot (THA)
Ornpimol Kittiteerasopon (THA)

==== Final ====
16 August 2015
17:30

Kazakhstan	4–2	Thailand
	Report

Umpires:
Emily Carroll (AUS)
Annie Thomas (MAS)

== Final standings ==
1. Kazakhstan
2. Thailand
3. Uzbekistan
4. Hong Kong
5. Cambodia

== See also ==
- 2015 Men's Indoor Hockey Asia Cup
