= 2017 Men's Indoor Hockey Asia Cup =

Tournament details
- Host country: Qatar
- City: Doha
- Dates: 24–28 April
- Teams: 8

Final positions
- Champions: Iran (7th title)
- Runner-up: Kazakhstan
- Third place: Qatar

Tournament statistics
- Matches played: 20
- Goals scored: 197 (9.85 per match)
- Top scorer: (Iran) Hamid Noraniyan (16 goals)

The 2017 Men's Indoor Hockey Asia Cup was the seventh edition of the Men's Indoor Hockey Asia Cup, the biennial international men's indoor hockey championship of Asia, organized by the Asian Hockey Federation. It was held in Doha, Qatar from 24 to 28 April 2017.

Iran defeated Kazakhstan in the final to win the cup and secured a place in 2018 Men's Indoor Hockey World Cup.

== Participating nations ==
The number of teams for this year’s cup has increased by three compared to the previous edition tournament where five teams competed. Tajikistan, who competed previously, did not join this year’s edition and were replaced by Malaysia, Oman and Thailand.

- Qatar
- Chinese Taipei
- Iran
- Kazakhstan
- Malaysia
- Oman
- Thailand
- Uzbekistan

== Umpires ==
1. Adam Barry (AUS)
2. Andres Ortiz (ESP)
3. Hassan Abazari (IRI)
4. Ahmed Al Hassani (OMA)
5. Abdou Mostafa Mahmoud (QAT)
6. Ahmed Rahzani (IRI)
7. Sen Xu (CHN)
8. Narongtuch Subboonsong (THA)
9. Makhsudbek Urmanov (KAZ)
10. Mohd Zainal (MAS)

== Results ==
All times are in Qatar Standard Time (UTC+03:00).

=== First round ===
==== Pool A ====
| Pos | Team | Pld | W | D | L | GF | GA | GD | Pts | Qualification |
|---|---|---|---|---|---|---|---|---|---|---|
| 1 | Iran | 3 | 3 | 0 | 0 | 30 | 6 | +24 | 9 | Advance to Semi-finals |
| 2 | Qatar (H) | 3 | 1 | 1 | 1 | 12 | 17 | −5 | 4 | Advance to Semi-finals |
| 3 | Malaysia | 3 | 1 | 0 | 2 | 13 | 18 | −5 | 3 | 5–8th place classification |
| 4 | Oman | 3 | 0 | 1 | 2 | 9 | 23 | −14 | 1 | 5–8th place classification |

Updated to match(es) played on 26 April 2017. Source: FIH
Rules for classification: 1) points; 2) goal difference; 3) goals scored; 4) head-to-head result.
(H) Hosts

24 April 2017
18:45

| Iran | 11–0 | Malaysia |
|---|---|---|
| | Report |

Umpires:
Andres Ortiz (ESP)
Makhsudbek Urmanov (KAZ)

24 April 2017
20:00

| Qatar | 4–4 | Oman |
|---|---|---|
| | Report |

Umpires:
Narongtuch Subboonsong (THA)
Ahmed Rahzani (IRI)

25 April 2017
18:45

| Malaysia | 9–2 | Oman |
|---|---|---|
| | Report |

Umpires:
Makhsudbek Urmanov (KAZ)
Hassan Abazari (IRI)

25 April 2017
20:00

| Qatar | 3–9 | Iran |
|---|---|---|
| | Report |

Umpires:
Adam Barry (AUS)
Sen Xu (CHN)

26 April 2017
15:00

| Iran | 10–3 | Oman |
|---|---|---|
| | Report |

Umpires:
Sen Xu (CHN)
Andres Ortiz (ESP)

26 April 2017
18:45

| Malaysia | 4–5 | Qatar |
|---|---|---|
| | Report |

Umpires:
Narongtuch Subboonsong (THA)
Adam Barry (AUS)

==== Pool B ====
| Pos | Team | Pld | W | D | L | GF | GA | GD | Pts | Qualification |
|---|---|---|---|---|---|---|---|---|---|---|
| 1 | Kazakhstan | 3 | 2 | 1 | 0 | 19 | 13 | +6 | 7 | Advance to Semi-finals |
| 2 | Uzbekistan | 3 | 1 | 2 | 0 | 12 | 7 | +5 | 5 | Advance to Semi-finals |
| 3 | Thailand | 3 | 1 | 1 | 1 | 10 | 10 | 0 | 4 | 5–8th place classification |
| 4 | Chinese Taipei | 3 | 0 | 0 | 3 | 6 | 17 | −11 | 0 | 5–8th place classification |

Updated to match(es) played on 26 April 2017. Source: FIH
Rules for classification: 1) points; 2) goal difference; 3) goals scored; 4) head-to-head result.

24 April 2017
15:00

| Kazakhstan | 7–3 | Chinese Taipei |
|---|---|---|
| | Report |

Umpires:
Adam Barry (AUS)
Abdou Mostafa Mahmoud (QAT)

24 April 2017
16:15

| Uzbekistan | 1–1 | Thailand |
|---|---|---|
| | Report |

Umpires:
Hassan Abazari (IRI)
Ahmed Al Hassani (OMA)

25 April 2017
13:45

| Chinese Taipei | 1–3 | Thailand |
|---|---|---|
| | Report |

Umpires:
Mohd Zainal (MAS)
Ahmed Rahzani (IRI)

25 April 2017
15:00

| Uzbekistan | 4–4 | Kazakhstan |
|---|---|---|
| | Report |

Umpires:
Ahmed Al Hassani (OMA)
Andres Ortiz (ESP)

26 April 2017
12:30

| Chinese Taipei | 2–7 | Uzbekistan |
|---|---|---|
| | Report |

Umpires:
Ahmed Rahzani (IRI)
Ahmed Al Hassani (OMA)

26 April 2017
13:45

| Kazakhstan | 8–6 | Thailand |
|---|---|---|
| | Report |

Umpires:
Hassan Abazari (IRI)
Abdou Mostafa Mahmoud (QAT)

=== Second round ===
==== Bracket ====
Semi-finals

Semi-finals
27 April
Iran | 12
Uzbekistan | 2
27 April
Kazakhstan | 5
Qatar | 4

Final
28 April
Iran | 10
Kazakhstan | 1
Third place
28 April
Uzbekistan | 3
Qatar | 5

5–8th place bracket

5–8th place semi-finals
27 April
Malaysia | 9
Chinese Taipei | 3
27 April
Thailand | 3
Oman | 5

Fifth place
28 April
Malaysia | 7
Oman | 5
Seventh place
28 April
Chinese Taipei | 5
Thailand | 7

==== Fifth to eighth place classification ====
===== Crossover =====
27 April 2017
12:30

| Malaysia | 9–3 | Chinese Taipei |
|---|---|---|
| | Report |

Umpires:
Makhsudbek Urmanov (KAZ)
Ahmed Al Hassani (OMA)

27 April 2017
14:00

| Thailand | 3–5 | Oman |
|---|---|---|
| | Report |

Umpires:
Mohd Zainal (MAS)
Abdou Mostafa Mahmoud (QAT)

===== Seventh and eighth place =====
28 April 2017
09:30

| Chinese Taipei | 5–7 | Thailand |
|---|---|---|
| | Report |

Umpires:
Sen Xu (CHN)
Ahmed Rahzani (IRI)

===== Fifth and sixth place =====
28 April 2017
12:30

| Malaysia | 7–5 | Oman |
|---|---|---|
| | Report |

Umpires:
Hassan Abazari (IRI)
Abdou Mostafa Mahmoud (QAT)

==== First to fourth place classification ====
===== Semifinals =====
27 April 2017
18:00

| Iran | 12–2 | Uzbekistan |
|---|---|---|
| | Report |

Umpires:
Narongtuch Subboonsong (THA)
Adam Barry (AUS)

27 April 2017
19:30

| Kazakhstan | 5–4 | Qatar |
|---|---|---|
| | Report |

Umpires:
Hassan Abazari (IRI)
Andres Ortiz (ESP)

===== Third and fourth place =====
28 April 2017
15:30

| Uzbekistan | 3–5 | Qatar |
|---|---|---|
| | Report |

Umpires:
Andres Ortiz (ESP)
Mohd Zainal (MAS)

===== Final =====
28 April 2017
18:30

| Iran | 10–1 | Kazakhstan |
|---|---|---|
| | Report |

Umpires:
Adam Barry (AUS)
Narongtuch Subboonsong (THA)

== Final standings ==
| Qualified for 2018 Men's Indoor Hockey World Cup |

| Rank | Team |
|---|---|
| Gold medal | Iran |
| Silver medal | Kazakhstan |
| Bronze medal | Qatar |
| 4 | Uzbekistan |
| 5 | Malaysia |
| 6 | Oman |
| 7 | Thailand |
| 8 | Chinese Taipei |
