= 2015 Men's Indoor Hockey Asia Cup =

Tournament details
- Host country: Kazakhstan
- City: Taldykorgan
- Dates: 13 May 2015–17 May 2015
- Teams: 5

Final positions
- Champions: Iran
- Runner-up: Kazakhstan
- Third place: Uzbekistan

Tournament statistics
- Matches played: 12
- Goals scored: 193 (16.08 per match)
- Top scorer: (Uzbekistan) Golib Kalandarov (21 goals)
All statistics are correct as of 4 May 2017


The 2015 Men's Indoor Hockey Asia Cup was the 6th edition of the Indoor Hockey Asia Cup specifically for men. It was held in Korgan City, Kazakhstan from 13 to 17 May 2015.

The number of teams for this year's cup are the same as for the previous tournament where five teams competed. Malaysia, Chinese Taipei and Indonesia, who competed previously did not join this year's edition and were replaced by Qatar, Tajikistan and Uzbekistan.

Iran defeated Kazakhstan in the final to win the cup.

== Participating nations ==
Five countries (6 teams) are participating in this year's tournament:

- Kazakhstan (Host)
- Kazakhstan B
- Iran
- Qatar
- Tajikistan
- Uzbekistan

== Umpires ==
1. Sean Edwards (ENG)
2. Makhsudbek Urmanov (KAZ)
3. Ahmad Kazemi (IRI)
4. Karimov Ruslan (UZB)
5. Kamran Shah (QAT)
6. Stirling Sharpe (AUS)

== Results ==
All times are in East Kazakhstan Standard Time (UTC+06:00).

=== Pool ===
Pos	Team	Pld	W	D	L	GF	GA	GD	Pts	Qualification
1	Iran	4	4	0	0	71	6	+65	12	Advance to final match
2	Kazakhstan (H)	4	3	0	1	30	16	+14	9	Advance to final match
3	Uzbekistan	4	2	0	2	37	28	+9	6	Advance to bronze medal match
4	Qatar	4	1	0	3	32	18	+14	3	Advance to bronze medal match
5	Tajikistan	4	0	0	4	4	106	−102	0	

Updated to match(es) played on 16 May 2015. Source: FIH
Rules for classification: 1) points; 2) goal difference; 3) goals scored; 4) head-to-head result.
(H) Hosts

13 May 2015
15:00

Kazakhstan	20–1	Tajikistan
	Report

Umpires:
Stirling Sharpe (AUS)
Kamran Shah (QAT)

13 May 2015
16:15

Uzbekistan	4–2	Qatar
	Report

Umpires:
Ahmad Kazemi (IRI)
Makhsudbek Urmanov (KAZ)

14 May 2015
09:00

Iran	33–0	Tajikistan
	Report

Umpires:
Makhsudbek Urmanov (KAZ)
Kamran Shah (QAT)

14 May 2015
11:30

Kazakhstan	3–2	Qatar
	Report

Umpires:
Stirling Sharpe (AUS)
Karimov Ruslan (UZB)

14 May 2015
16:00

Uzbekistan	3–16	Iran
	Report

Umpires:
Sean Edwards (ENG)
Kamran Shah (QAT)

15 May 2015
10:00

Qatar	25–0	Tajikistan
	Report

Umpires:
Makhsudbek Urmanov (KAZ)
Ahmad Kazemi (IRI)

15 May 2015
11:15

Kazakhstan	0–11	Iran
	Report

Umpires:
Sean Edwards (ENG)
Stirling Sharpe (AUS)

15 May 2015
15:00

Tajikistan	3–28	Uzbekistan
	Report

Umpires:
Kamran Shah (QAT)
Stirling Sharpe (AUS)

16 May 2015
16:00

Iran	11–3	Qatar
	Report

Umpires:
Sean Edwards (ENG)
Stirling Sharpe (AUS)

16 May 2015
17:15

Uzbekistan	2–7	Kazakhstan
	Report

Umpires:
Ahmad Kazemi (IRI)
Kamran Shah (QAT)

=== KAZ B Results ===
1. IRI 13-1 KAZ B
2. UZB 8-0 KAZ B
3. KAZ 19-0 KAZ B
4. QAT 8-2 KAZ B
5. TJK 1-18 KAZ B

=== Classification ===
==== Bronze medal ====
17 May 2015
10:00

Uzbekistan	5–3	Qatar
	Report

Umpires:
Ahmad Kazemi (IRI)
Stirling Sharpe (AUS)

==== Final ====
17 May 2015
11:30

Iran	9–2	Kazakhstan
	Report

Umpires:
Sean Edwards (ENG)
Kamran Shah (QAT)

== Final standings ==
Rank	Team
Gold medal	Iran
Silver medal	Kazakhstan
Bronze medal	Uzbekistan
4	Qatar
5	Tajikistan
