= Malaysia men's national indoor hockey team =

Malaysia
- Association: Malaysian Hockey Confederation
- Confederation: AHF (Asia)

FIH ranking
- Current: 12 (January 2026)

World Cup
- Appearances: 1 (first in 2025)
- Best result: 11th (2025)

Asia Cup
- Appearances: 9 (first in 2008)
- Best result: 1st (2022)

The Malaysia men's national indoor hockey team represents the Malaysia in men's international indoor hockey and is controlled by the Malaysian Hockey Confederation.

== History ==
Malaysia has been fielding an indoor hockey team as early as 2007, when it sent a team at the 2nd Asian Indoor Games in Macau.

Malaysia has been a long-time participant in the Men's Indoor Hockey Asia Cup, which has been dominated by Iran since the tournament's inaugural edition in 2008. Malaysia hosted the first three editions in Ipoh in 2008, 2009, and 2010, finishing as runners-up on each occasion. The team subsequently finished third in 2012 before again reaching the final in 2014. Malaysia did not participate in the 2015 edition.

Indoor hockey was introduced at the 2017 SEA Games in Malaysia, where the hosts won the inaugural men's tournament. They successfully defended the title at the 2019 SEA Games in the Philippines

In the 2022 edition, Malaysia won its first Asia Cup title in Thailand, defeating Iran in the final and ending Iran's eight-title winning streak. At the 2023 SEA Games in Cambodia, Malaysia reached the final again but settled for silver.

The team made its Men's FIH Indoor Hockey World Cup in the 2025 edition in Croatia, finishing 11th among 12 teams after defeating Trinidad and Tobago in the final classification match. Later that year, Malaysia returned to the 2025 SEA Games final in Thailand and again won the silver medal.

== Records ==
=== World Cup ===
World Cup record
Year	Host	Position	Pld	W	D	L	GF	GA
2025	Poreč, Croatia	11th	3	1	0	4	14	30

=== Asian Cup ===
Asia Cup record
Year	Host	Position	Pld	W	D	L	GF	GA
2019	Chonburi, Thailand	3rd	6	4	0	2	38	13
2022	Bangkok, Thailand	1st	7	3	3	1	30	12
2024	Chonburi, Thailand	2nd	6	3	2	1	33	15

=== Asian Indoor Games ===
Asian Indoor Games record
Year	Host	Position	Pld	W	D	L	GF	GA
2007	Macau	4th	5	2	3	1	30	21
2021	Bangkok and Chonburi, Thailand	Cancelled						

=== SEA Games ===
SEA Games record
Year	Host	Position	Pld	W	D	L	GF	GA
2017	Segambut, Malaysia	1st	5	5	0	0	45	2
2019	Los Baños, Philippines	1st	7	7	0	0	34	2
2023	Phnom Penh, Cambodia	2nd	5	5	1	0	45	9
2025	Bangkok, Thailand	2nd	5	5	1	0	42	12
