= Esports at the 2023 Southeast Asian Games – Valorant tournament =

Esports event at the SEA Games

Valorant at the 2023 SEA Games
- Venue: Olympia Mall
- Location: Phnom Penh, Cambodia
- Dates: 8–10 May 2023
- Competitors: 30 from 6 nations
- Teams: 6

Medalists
gold medal	Indonesia (INA)
gold medal	Singapore (SIN)
bronze medal	Philippines (PHI)
bronze medal	Vietnam (VIE)

The Valorant tournament for the 2023 Southeast Asian Games was held on May 8 to 10 at the Olympia Mall in Phnom Penh, Cambodia. This is the inaugural appearance of the title in the games, in which there were joint gold medal winners, as well as joint bronze medal winners.

Indonesia and Singapore took home joint gold medals following the controversial gold medal match which was marred by an alleged in-game bug abuse. There were no silver medals awarded, however, as the Philippines and Vietnam took home bronze medals despite the former winning the bronze medal match.

The tournament consisted of single round-robin group stage and a single-elimination playoff stage.

== Participating teams ==
There are six nations that participated in the Valorant tournament.

- Philippines (PHI)
- Cambodia (CAM)
- Vietnam (VIE)
- Indonesia (INA)
- Singapore (SIN)
- Malaysia (MAS)

== Group Stage ==
All matches were a best-of-1 series, and the top four teams after the group stages qualified for the semifinals.

Pos	Team	Pld	W	L	PF	PA	PD	Pts	Qualification
1	Philippines (Q)	5	5	0	65	34	+31	15	Advanced to the Semifinals
2	Vietnam (Q)	5	4	1	62	41	+21	12	Advanced to the Semifinals
3	Singapore (Q)	5	3	2	65	58	+7	9	Advanced to the Semifinals
4	Indonesia (Q)	5	2	3	55	60	−5	6	Advanced to the Semifinals
5	Cambodia (H, E)	5	1	4	45	61	−16	3	Eliminated
6	Malaysia (E)	5	0	5	27	65	−38	0	Eliminated

Source: Esports.gg
Rules for classification: 1.) Head-to-head results; 2.) Head-to-head rounds, 3.) Round differential
(E) Eliminated; (H) Hosts; (Q) Qualified for the phase indicated

Team	(Philippines) PHI	(Vietnam) VIE	(Singapore) SIN	(Indonesia) INA	(Cambodia) CAM	(Malaysia) MAS
Philippines		13–9	13–8	13–2	13–8	13–7
Vietnam			14–12	13–8	13–4	13–4
Singapore				19–17	13–7	13–7
Indonesia					15–13	13–2
Cambodia						13–7
Malaysia						

Source: Esports.gg
Legend: Blue = left column team win; Red = top row team win.
Matches with lighter background shading were decided after overtime.

== Knockout stage ==
Semifinals
1	Philippines	0
4	Indonesia	2
2	Vietnam	0
3	Singapore	2

Gold medal match
4	Indonesia	0
3	Singapore	2*
Bronze medal match
1	Philippines	2
2	Vietnam	0

=== Semifinals ===
Winners advanced to the gold medal match, while losers were relegated to the bronze medal match.

Semi-final A	May 10	Philippines	0	–	2	Indonesia	Phnom Penh
	10:00 (UTC+7)						Olympia Mall
		2	Lotus			13	
		1	Ascent			13	
			~~Split~~				

Semi-final B	May 10	Vietnam	0	–	2	Singapore	Phnom Penh
	12:00 (UTC+7)						Olympia Mall
		7	Ascent			13	
		8	Fracture			13	
			~~Bind~~				

=== Bronze medal match ===
Bronze Medal Final	May 10	Philippines	2	–	0	Vietnam	Phnom Penh
	14:00 (UTC+7)						Olympia Mall
		13	Ascent			5	
		13	Haven			10	
			~~Fracture~~				

=== Gold medal match ===
Gold Medal Final	May 10	Indonesia	0	–	2	Singapore	Phnom Penh
	17:00 (UTC+7)						Olympia Mall
		8	Ascent			13	
		4	Split			10	
			~~Fracture~~				

The gold medal match was marred by controversy after a protest from Indonesia was raised, saying that the Cypher camera placement by one of the players of Team Singapore, Ingram Tan, was used to gain an unfair advantage. However, this was refuted by Singapore's Tidus Goh, stating that the rulebooks stated that 'as long as the camera is viewable and able to be destroyed by both teams, it is legal, furthermore according to the rulebook, the penalty depends if the bug had an impact on the round'. He also revealed fully through TwitLonger on what happened onsite during the controversy. The camera placement has stirred a debate within the Valorant Southeast Asian community, with mixed opinions on it. With this, the tournament officials were forced to suspend play at the start of the 15th round of the second game with Singapore already leading the series after winning Game 1 earlier, leading to review the potential bug abuse.

After an initial lengthy review, the tournament officials decided to roll back and replay the game to round 14, with Singapore leading 9–4. However, Indonesia disputed this, claiming that the bug occurred on that round. A new set of ruling was then sent out at 4 a.m. that the match be replayed at round 11, with the score being tied at 5–5. Just when the play is about to resume at 8 a.m. the next day, Team Indonesia told the organizers that they would forfeit the series, saying that 'it was unfair that the rules had not made clear'. With the result, the second game was abandoned with the scoreline of 10–4 as is, and giving the 2–0 win to Singapore. The spokesperson of the Singapore Esports Association, Janet Su, stated in an interview that the SEA Games Organizing Committee offered both teams to become joint-gold medalists of the tournament, in which Singapore accepted in the spirit of sportsmanship.

== Viewership ==
The tournament had the highest peak viewership of 44,324 live viewers in the tournament particularly during the controversial gold medal match between Singapore and Indonesia, and the tournament also averaged 11,829 viewers throughout the tournament.
