= Diving at the 2023 SEA Games =

- Venue: Olympic Swimming Pool, Morodok Techo National Stadium
- Location: Phnom Penh, Cambodia
- Dates: 8–11 May 2023

Diving events at the 2023 SEA Games took place at Olympic Swimming Pool, in Phnom Penh, Cambodia from 8 to 11 May 2023. It was one of four aquatic sports at the Games, along with finswimming, swimming, and water polo.

== Competition schedule ==
The following is the competition schedule for the diving competitions:

F	Final

Event↓/Date →	8th Mon	9th Tue	10th Wed	11th Thu
Men's 3 m springboard		F		
Men's 10 m platform				F
Women's 3 m springboard	F			
Women's 10 m platform			F	

== Medal table ==
* Host nation (Cambodia)

Rank	Nation	Gold	Silver	Bronze	Total
1	Malaysia	4	2	1	7
2	Indonesia	0	1	1	2
3	Vietnam	0	1	0	1
4	Singapore	0	0	2	2
Totals (4 entries)		4	4	4	12

== Medalists ==
Event	Gold	Silver	Bronze
Men's 3 m springboard	Muhammad Syafiq Puteh; Malaysia	Gabriel Gilbert Daim; Malaysia	Avvir Tham Pac Lun; Singapore
Men's platform	Enrique Maccartney Harold; Malaysia	Bertrand Rhodict Lises; Malaysia	Max Lee Shen Oon; Singapore
Women's 3 m springboard	Kimberly Bong; Malaysia	Gladies Lariesa Garina Haga; Indonesia	Ong Ker Ying; Malaysia
Women's platform	Lee Yiat Qing; Malaysia	Bùi Thị Hồng Giang; Vietnam	Gladies Lariesa Garina Haga; Indonesia

== See also ==
- Diving at the 2023 SEA Games – Results
- Swimming at the 2023 SEA Games
- Water polo at the 2023 SEA Games
