= Indoor hockey at the 2023 SEA Games – Women's tournament =

Women's indoor hockey at the 2023 SEA Games
Tournament details
- Host country: Cambodia
- City: Phnom Penh
- Dates: 1–7 May
- Teams: 6 (from 1 confederation)
- Venue: Dinosaur Park Hall

Final positions
- Champions: Thailand
- Runner-up: Malaysia

Tournament statistics
- Matches played: 16
- Goals scored: 97 (6.06 per match)
- Top scorer(s): (Indonesia) Wardani Desi (Malaysia) Hussin Iren (8 goals)

The women's field hockey tournament at the 2023 SEA Games will take place from 1 to 7 May 2023 at the Dinosaur Park Hall, Phnom Penh, Cambodia. 6 teams took part in the competition.

== Squad ==
Cambodia (CAM)	Indonesia (INA)	Malaysia (MAS)
Head Coach: (Cambodia) Sovanphearum Chheoung; Misan Phor; Ry Heng; Raksa Sin; Saroeu Vun; Mam Ta; Monika Lun; Chakriya Eng; Sreysros Eng; Sorphorn Seng; Nida Majeed; Chansovatey Duch; Koemyean Dy	Head Coach: (Malaysia) Dhaarma Raj; Aulia Rahma Dwi; Zulita; Purbasari Citra; Patmawati; Risdiyanti Winda; Since Novita; Sugiarti Nuraini; Melis Ai; Wardani Desi; El Islamy Annur; Florentina Selly; Krismonita Putri	Head Coach: (Malaysia) Mohammed Rodhanizam Mat Radzi; Farah Ayuni Yahya; Surizan Awang Noh; Nuraslinda Said; Nor Isahhidun; Halimi Qasidah; Norsharina Shahbuddin; Putri Nur Batrisyia Nor Nawawi; Nurul Farawahida Marzuki; Fazilla Sylvester Silin; Nur Atira Mohamad Ismail; Iren Hussin; Nur Hazlinda Zainal Abidin
Philippines (PHI)	Singapore (SGP)	Thailand (THA)
Head Coach: (Philippines) Christian Galicia; Rivera Maureen; Palic Jenelyn; Milan Mariella; Bedo Alliah; Transi Jonalyn; Natan Maribelle; Oquendo Carla; Rivas Lasantha; Aldana Lorraine; Saludo Metchie; Oliva Veveca; Lumbo Jaylene	Head Coach: (Singapore) Nordin Manaff; Teh Pui Fang Jessie; Abdull Nur Atiqah; Noradi Nasuha; Alvarez Wannelenah; Low Shirmin; Siti Hajar Binte Asri; Sadali Nadrah; Phua Min; Lim Jee; Ibrahim Nadia; Abdullah Nur Ashikin; Chen Jingyi	Head Coach: (Thailand) Calab Koilpillai; Losantia Kittiya; Duangwao Wilawan; Todkaew Jiratchaya; Bureewan Benjamas; Sakulpithak Tikhamporn; Jomjan Priyakorn; Phakdeengam Phimphakan; Tongkham Thanaporn; Pathumpairot Chatchanan; Metta Phimmada; Ogbuneke Papichaya; Suttiprapa Somlak

== Results ==
=== Group stage ===
Pos	Team	Pld	W	D	L	GF	GA	GD	Pts	Qualification
1	Malaysia	5	4	1	0	28	2	+26	13	Advance to Gold Medal Match
2	Thailand	5	3	2	0	22	4	+18	11	Advance to Gold Medal Match
3	Indonesia	5	3	0	2	29	9	+20	9	Bronze Medal
4	Cambodia (H)	5	2	0	3	11	20	−9	6	Bronze Medal
5	Singapore	5	1	1	3	5	16	−11	4	
6	Philippines	5	0	0	5	2	46	−44	0	

Source: FIH
(H) Hosts

1 May 2023
11:45

Thailand	8–0	Philippines
Todkaew Jiratchaya 3', 24'; Jomjan Priyakorn 4'; Tongkham Thanaporn 6', 38'; Bureewan Benjamas 8'; Duangwao Wilawan 17', 23'	Report

Umpires:
Aziz Rahimah (Singapore)
Cassidy Gallagher (Australia)

1 May 2023
14:15

Malaysia	8–0	Singapore
Shabuddin Norsharina 2'; Said Nuraslinda 7', 9', 17', 18'; Sylvester Fazilla 12', 33'; Hussin Iren 25'	Report

Umpires:
Alizah Puteri (Indonesia)
Oimmak Jureporn (Thailand)

1 May 2023
16:45

Indonesia	7–1	Cambodia
Sugiarti Nuraini 5', 30'; Aulia Rahma Dwi 9', 32'; Since Novita 22'; Purbasari Citra 35'; Wardani Desi 39'	Report	Mam Ta 20'

Umpires:
Shigeki Kodama (Japan)
Andrea Parungao (Philippines)

2 May 2023
11:45

Philippines	0–12	Malaysia
	Report	Said Nuraslinda 5'; Awang Surizan 7', 28'; Sylvester Fazilla 10', 22', 34'; Hussin Iren 11', 11', 22'; Shabuddin Norsharina 15', 36'; Isahhidun Nor 38'

Umpires:
Phiraphat Niensupornphand (Thailand)
Aziz Rahimah (Singapore)

2 May 2023
14:15

Indonesia	4–0	Singapore
Aulia Rahma Dwi 23', 26'; Sugiarti Nuraini 28'; Wardani Desi 39'	Report

Umpires:
Cassidy Gallagher (Australia)
Phea Phut (Cambodia)

2 May 2023
16:45

Thailand	9–0	Cambodia
Duangwao Wilawan 3', 11'; Todkaew Jiratchaya 14', 15'; Sakulpithak Tikhamporn 19', 20', 21'; Tongkham Thanaporn 36', 38'	Report

Umpires:
Andrea Parungao (Philippines)
Puteri Alizah (Indonesia)

3 May 2023
13:00

Philippines	1–14	Indonesia
Lumbo Jaylene 29'	Report	Wardani Desi 6', 10', 38'; Aulia Rahma Dwi 9', 27'; El Islamy Annur 19', 29'; Patmawati 21', 23'; Melis Ai 26', 30', 37'; Since Novita 33', 35'

Umpires:
Aziz Rahimah (Singapore)
Oimmak Jureporn (Thailand)

3 May 2023
15:30

Malaysia	0–0	Thailand
	Report

Umpires:
Zeke Newman (Australia)
Cassidy Gallagher (Australia)

3 May 2023
18:00

Singapore	0–1	Cambodia
	Report	Saroeu Vun 34'

Umpires:
Puteri Alizah (Indonesia)
Alberto Sitepu (Indonesia)

4 May 2023
11:45

Singapore	3–1	Philippines
Ibrahim Nadia 21'; Siti Hajar Binte Asri 28'; Alvarez Wannelenah 34'	Report	Lumbo Jaylene 38'

Umpires:
Ali Shahbaz (Bangladesh)
Oimmak Jureporn (Thailand)

4 May 2023
14:15

Indonesia	2–3	Thailand
Wardani Desi 21', 21'	Report	Sakulpithak Tikhamporn 8', 38'; Todkaew Jiratchaya 22'

Umpires:
Shigeki Kodama (Japan)
Cassidy Gallagher (Australia)

4 May 2023
16:45

Cambodia	0–4	Malaysia
	Report	Sylvester Fazilla 5'; Hussin Iren 24'; Mohamad Nur 27'; Halimi Qasidah 29'

Umpires:
Aziz Rahimah (Singapore)
Alizah Puteri (Indonesia)

6 May 2023
13:00

Malaysia	4–2	Indonesia
Hussin Iren 5', 10', 26'; Mohamad Nur 14'	Report	Wardani Desi 8'; Sugiarti Nuraini 19'

Umpires:
Zeke Newman (Australia)
Cassidy Gallagher (Australia)

6 May 2023
15:30

Thailand	2–2	Singapore
Duangwao Wilawan 19', 30'	Report	Alvarez Wannelenah 2'; Ibrahim Nadia 29'

Umpires:
Ali Shahbaz (Bangladesh)
Alizah Puteri (Indonesia)

6 May 2023
18:00

Cambodia	9–0	Philippines
Chansovatey Duch 0', 13', 24', 30'; Chakriya Eng 11', 12', 38'; Saroeu Vun 27', 38'	Report

Umpires:
Raman Baskar (Malaysia)
Aziz Rahimah (Singapore)

=== Gold Medal Match ===
7 May 2023
18:00

Malaysia	0–0	Thailand
	Report
Penalties
Hussin Iren (penalty shoot-out missed); Isahhidun Nor (penalty shoot-out missed); Shabuddin Norsharina (penalty shoot-out scored); Shabuddin Norsharina (penalty shoot-out missed)	1–2	Sakulpithak Tikhamporn (penalty shoot-out scored); Todkaew Jiratchaya (penalty shoot-out missed); Duangwao Wilawan (penalty shoot-out missed); Sakulpithak Tikhamporn (penalty shoot-out scored)

Umpires:
Cassidy Gallagher (Australia)
Shigeki Kodama (Japan)

== Final standings ==
Rank	Team
1st place, gold medalist(s)	Thailand
2nd place, silver medalist(s)	Malaysia
3rd place, bronze medalist(s)	Indonesia
3rd place, bronze medalist(s)	Cambodia
5	Singapore
6	Philippines

== See also ==
- Indoor hockey at the 2023 SEA Games – Men's tournament
