= Jarod Hatch =

Filipino swimmer

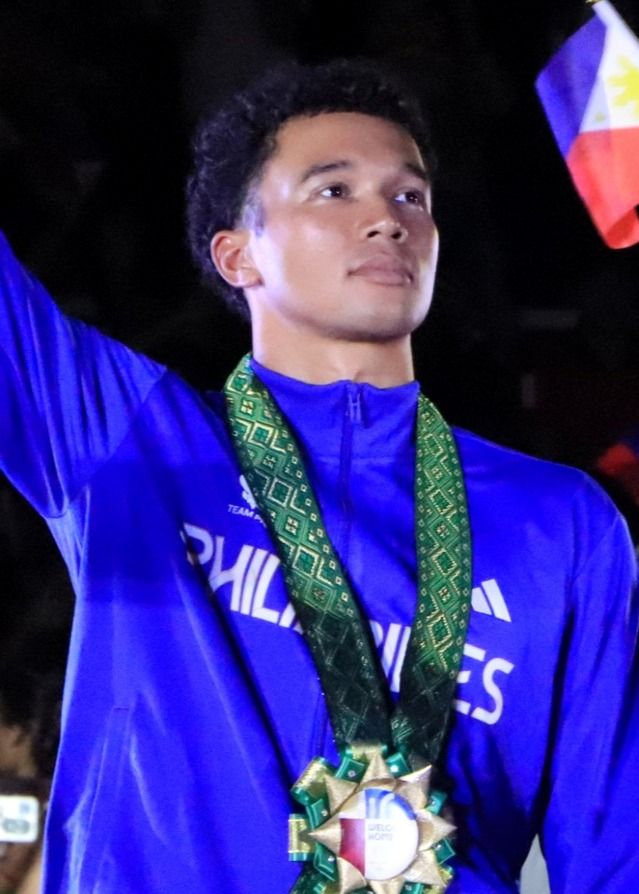
- Hatch in 2024

Personal information
- Full name: Jarod Jason Hatch
- National team: Philippines; Suspended Member Federation (2023)
- Born: December 10, 1998 (age 27) Daly City, California, U.S.
- Home town: Morgan Hill, California, U.S.
- Height: 6 ft 2 in (188 cm)

Sport
- Sport: Swimming
- Strokes: Butterfly
- College team: California Golden Bears
Medal record
Men's swimming
Representing Philippines
Southeast Asian Games
Silver medal – second place	2019 Philippines	4 x 100 m freestyle relay
Bronze medal – third place	2023 Cambodia	100 m butterfly
Bronze medal – third place	2023 Cambodia	50 m butterfly
Mixed Swimming
Representing Philippines
Southeast Asian Games
Silver medal – second place	2023 Cambodia	4 x 100 m medley relay

Jarod Jason Lang Hatch is a Filipino swimmer who competed at the 2024 Summer Olympics.

== Early life and education ==
Jarod Hatch was born on December 10, 1998 in Daly City, California in the United States. He would spend some part of his childhood in San Francisco before his family moved to Morgan Hill which he considers as his hometown and where he started his swimming career.

He attended Sobrato High School in Morgan Hill, California where he graduated from in 2017. He would enter the University of California, Berkeley under a swimming scholarship and pursued a major in business. He graduated in 2021.

== Career ==
=== High school ===
Hatch swam for Sobrato High. He bagged an individual Central Coast Section championship in the 200 freestyle, and had two runner-up and one third-place finish in the California Interscholastic Federation (CIF) State Championships. Aside from being a swimmer, Hatch was also a water polo player for his high school.

=== College ===
Hatch would also be part of the California Golden Bears swimming team while he was studying at University of California, Berkeley.

=== National team ===
Hatch represents the Philippines internationally in swimming. He first became part of the Philippine national team in 2018.

Hatch would participate in the 2019 SEA Games in the Philippines. He failed to medal, missing the podium of the men's 100m butterfly and was part of the team which failed to finish in the men's 4 × 100 m medley However he and his teammates would win a silver in the 4 × 100 m freestyle relay. Hatch would retire after the games in May 2021.

Hatch would return out of retirement in October 2022. He would take part in the national trials in February 2023 to earn a berth for the 2023 SEA Games in Cambodia., where he clinched a two bronzes in the 100m butterfly and 50m fly events and a silver in the 4 × 100 m mixed relay team.

He holds the Philippine national record for the men's 100m butterfly having clocked 52.87 seconds in the heats of the 2023 World Aquatics Championships competing under the Suspended Member Federation delegation.

Hatch would qualify for the 2024 Summer Olympics in Paris. He was nominated to fill in the quota for the Philippines under the universality rule.

=== 2024 Paris Olympics ===
Jarod failed to advanced in the semi-finals of his event after he placed 8th in the Heat 2 of the Men's 100m butterfly event clocking 54:66 seconds at the 2024 Summer Olympics. His final ranking is 36th overall in the men's 100m butterfly.

== Personal life ==
Hatch is of African American descent. He also has Filipino heritage through his mother.
