= Sailing at the 2023 SEA Games – Results =

The men's sailing competitions at the 2023 SEA Games took place at Sokha Beach in Sihanoukville, Cambodia from 2 to 8 May 2023. The 2023 Games comprises 9 medal events.

== Results ==
=== Men's ILCA 7 ===
Rank	Athlete	Race											Total Points	Net Points
Rank	Athlete	1	2	3	4	5	6	7	8	9	10	MR	Total Points	Net Points
1st place, gold medalist(s)	Ryan Lo (SGP)	1	1	(~~2~~)	1	1	1	1	1	1	1	2	13	11
2nd place, silver medalist(s)	Arthit Mikhail Romanyk (THA)	(~~3~~)	2	1	2	3	3	2	2	2	2	6	28	25
3rd place, bronze medalist(s)	Muhammad Faizal Ahmad Asri (MAS)	2	(~~3~~)	3	3	2	2	3	3	3	3	4	31	28
4	Nhov Chan (CAM)	4	5	5	4	4	4	7 DNE	(~~6~~)	6	5	8	58	52
5	Jeanson Gimeno Lumapas (PHI)	5	4	4	(~~6~~)	5	5	7 DNE	5	4	4	10	59	53
6	Bui Tuan Anh (VIE)	(~~6~~)	6	6	5	6	6	4	4	5	6	14; DNC	68	62

Legend: DNC – Did not come to the starting area; DNE – Non excludable disqualification;

=== Men's Windfoil IQ: Foil ===
Rank	Athlete	Race																Total Points	Net Points
Rank	Athlete	1	2	3	4	5	6	7	8	9	10	11	12	13	14	15	MR	Total Points	Net Points
1st place, gold medalist(s)	Ek Boonsawad (THA)	1	1	(~~3~~)	2	1	1	2	1	(~~3~~)	1	1	1	1	3	1	2	25	19
2nd place, silver medalist(s)	Elkan Reshawn Oh (SGP)	(~~3~~)	2	2	3	(~~4~~)	2	3	3	1	3	2	2	2	1	2	4	39	32
3rd place, bronze medalist(s)	John Harold Abarintos Madrigal (PHI)	2	(~~3~~)	1	1	2	(~~3~~)	1	2	2	2	3	3	3	2	3	6	39	33
4	Hen Sophy (CAM)	4	4	4	4	3	4	4	(~~5~~)	4	4	4	4	(~~5~~); DNF	4	4	10; DNF	71	61

Legend: DNF – Did not finish;

=== Men's Windfoil IQ: Foil Youth ===
Rank	Athlete	Race																Total Points	Net Points
Rank	Athlete	1	2	3	4	5	6	7	8	9	10	11	12	13	14	15	MR	Total Points	Net Points
1st place, gold medalist(s)	Passapong Lianglam (THA)	1	(~~3~~)	2	1	1	(~~3~~)	1	1	1	1	1	3	1	1	1	2	24	18
2nd place, silver medalist(s)	Andrei Frego Tugade (PHI)	2	1	1	(~~3~~)	2	1	2	2	2	2	(~~3~~)	1	3	2	3	4	34	28
3rd place, bronze medalist(s)	Keo Pheanon (CAM)	3	2	3	2	3	2	3	3	(~~4~~); ~~BFD~~	(~~4~~); ~~UFD~~	2	2	2	3	2	6	46	38

Legend: BFD – Black flag disqualification; UFD – "U" flag disqualification;

=== Men's Windsurfing RS:One ===
Rank	Athlete	Race													Total Points	Net Points
Rank	Athlete	1	2	3	4	5	6	7	8	9	10	11	12	MR	Total Points	Net Points
1st place, gold medalist(s)	Izry Hafiezy Fitry Azri (MAS)	2	1	3	2	(~~5~~)	1	2	3	1	4	1	3	2	30	25
2nd place, silver medalist(s)	Keo Phearun (CAM)	1	(~~5~~)	2	3	1	3	4	1	2	1	4	1	4	32	27
3rd place, bronze medalist(s)	Dhenver John Centino Castillo (PHI)	(~~4~~)	2	1	1	2	2	1	4	4	3	2	2	10	38	34
4	Todsawat Sianglam (THA)	(~~5~~)	3	4	4	3	5	5	5	5	2	3	4	6	54	49
5	David Tiong Gee Ng (SGP)	3	4	5	5	4	4	3	2	3	5	(~~6~~); ~~DNF~~	5	8	57	51

Legend: DNF – Did not finish;

=== Men's Windsurfing RS:X ===
Rank	Athlete	Race													Total Points	Net Points
Rank	Athlete	1	2	3	4	5	6	7	8	9	10	11	12	MR	Total Points	Net Points
1st place, gold medalist(s)	Muhammad Hafizin Mansor (MAS)	(~~3~~)	1	2	1	1	1	1	1	2	1	1	1	2	18	15
2nd place, silver medalist(s)	Jayson Jian Sen Tan (SGP)	2	2	1	2	2	(~~3~~)	2	3	1	2	2	3	4	29	26
3rd place, bronze medalist(s)	Sem Brospov (CAM)	1	(~~4~~)	4	3	3	2	3	2	3	3	3	2	6	39	35
4	Witthawat Lerdlam (THA)	4	3	3	4	(~~5~~); DNF	4	4	4	4	4	4	4	8	55	50

Legend: DNF – Did not finish;

=== Women's ILCA 6 ===
Rank	Athlete	Race											Total Points	Net Points
Rank	Athlete	1	2	3	4	5	6	7	8	9	10	MR	Total Points	Net Points
1st place, gold medalist(s)	Thorfun Boonnak (THA)	1	2	(~~3~~)	1	2	1	1	1	3	2	2	19	16
2nd place, silver medalist(s)	Jania Ang (SGP)	2	1	1	(~~3~~)	2	3	2	2	2	1	4	22	19
3rd place, bronze medalist(s)	Nur Adlina Nasreen Mohd Nasri (MAS)	(~~3~~)	3	2	2	3	2	3	3	1	3	6	31	28
4	Nguyen Thi My Hanh (VIE)	4	4	4	(~~5~~)	5	5	4	4	4	4	8	51	46
5	Tith Somsoriya (CAM)	(~~5~~)	5	5	4	4	4	5	5	5	5	10	57	52

=== Mixed Optimist ===
Rank	Athlete	Race											Total Points	Net Points
Rank	Athlete	1	2	3	4	5	6	7	8	9	10	MR	Total Points	Net Points
1st place, gold medalist(s)	Thailand; Chanatip Tongglum; Patcharaphan Ongkaloy	1; 3	1; 2	1; 2	3; 2	4; 2	1; 3	(~~5~~); 2	2; 3	2 (~~4~~)	3; 2	6; 4	58; 29; 29	49; 24; 25
2nd place, silver medalist(s)	Singapore; Cheryl Heng Xi Yong; Ethan Chia Han Wei	(~~7~~); 2	6 (~~3~~)	6; 3	5; 1	3; 1	4; 2	4; 1	6; 1	5; 1	7; 1	10; 2	81; 63; 18	71; 56; 15
3rd place, bronze medalist(s)	Malaysia; Muhammad Hilfi Nafael Mohd Hasrizan; Sara Amanda Mohd Noor Azman	5; 4	(~~7~~); 4	5; 4	4 (~~6~~)	6; 5	6; 5	6; 3	5; 4	3; 6	4; 5	14; 8	119; 65; 54	106; 58; 48
4	Philippines; Josa Verzosa Gonzales; Ronello Casillano Castillo	(~~8~~); 6	8; 5	8; 7	8; 7	8; 7	8; 7	7 (~~11~~); UFD	8; 7	8; 7	8; 6	12; 16	177; 91; 86	158; 83; 75
5	Cambodia; Bo Sam Y Burggraaf Serey Thara	10; 9	10; 9	10; 9	9; 10	9 (~~11~~); ~~DNF~~	9; 11; DNF	8; 11; UFD	9; 11; RET	9; 10	10; 9	18; 12	231; 111; 120	210; 101; 109

Legend: DNF – Did not finish; RET – Retired; UFD – "U" flag disqualification;

=== ILCA 4 ===
Rank	Athlete	Race											Total Points	Net Points
Rank	Athlete	1	2	3	4	5	6	7	8	9	10	MR	Total Points	Net Points
1st place, gold medalist(s)	Isaac Goh (SGP)	1	1	1	1	1	1	(~~2~~)	2	1	1	4	16	14
2nd place, silver medalist(s)	Thanapat Siricharoen (THA)	(~~3~~)	3	3	2	3	2	1	1	2	3	2	25	22
3rd place, bronze medalist(s)	Muhammad Asnawi Iqbal Adam (MAS)	2	2	2	(~~3~~)	2	3	3	3	3	2	6	31	28
4	Teogenes Ambong Vilando (PHI)	4	4	4	4	5	(~~6~~)	4	5	5	4	10	31	28
5	Bui Nguyen Le Hang (VIE)	5	5	(~~6~~)	6	4	4	5	4	4	5	8	56	50
6	Sambath Chornsann (CAM)	6	6	5	5	(~~7~~); DSQ	5	6	6	6	6	12	70	63

Legend: DSQ – Disqualified;

=== 29er ===
Rank	Athlete	Race													Total Points	Net Points
Rank	Athlete	1	2	3	4	5	6	7	8	9	10	11	12	MR	Total Points	Net Points
1st place, gold medalist(s)	Singapore; Ellyn Jiamin Tan; Teck Pin Chia	3	2	2	(~~6~~); DSQ	2	1	2	1	3	1	2	2	2	29	23
2nd place, silver medalist(s)	Malaysia; Abdul Latif Mansor; Muhammad Dhiauddin Rozaini	1	1	(~~3~~)	2	3	2	1	3	2	2	1	1	4	26	23
3rd place, bronze medalist(s)	Thailand; Suthon Yampinid; Sutida Poonpat	2	(~~3~~)	1	1	1	3	3	2	1	3	3	3	6	32	29
4	Cambodia; Sin Samnang; Sun Chandoeun	4	(~~6~~); DNF	6 DNS	3	6 DNF	6 DNF	4	4	4	4	4	4	8	63	57
5	Vietnam; Pham Van Mach; Ta Ba Trong	5	4	4	4	(~~6~~); DNF	6 DNF	5	5	5	5	5	5	10	69	63

Legend: DNF – Did not finish; DSQ – Disqualified;
