= Swimming at the 2023 SEA Games =

- Venue: Morodok Tecno National Aquatics Center
- Location: Phnom Penh, Cambodia
- Date: 6–11 May 2023
- Nations: 11

The swimming competitions at the 2023 SEA Games took place at Morodok Techo National Aquatics Center in Phnom Penh from 6 to 11 May 2023.

It was one of four aquatic sports at the Games, along with diving, finswimming and Water Polo. A total of 39 events was contested at this edition. The 800m/1500m freestyle for men and women was removed respectively, and was replaced with the introduction of the mixed 4X100m medley relay for the first time in SEA Games history.

== Summary ==
Singapore once again cemented their swimming dominance in Southeast Asia by a wide margin. Winning 47 medals, consisting of 22 gold, 16 silver and 9 bronze across the competition, the country achieved their best ever away results. Singapore won over half of the gold medals at 22 out of 39, and the country got their 1,000th gold medal at the SEA Games on the pool. One of their swimmers, Jonathan Tan, also achieved Olympic qualification timing for the 2024 Summer Olympics in Paris – while at the same time breaking the Southeast Asian Games record and national record.

== Participating nations ==
All 11 Nations competed in Swimming.

- Brunei
- Cambodia
- Indonesia
- Laos
- Malaysia
- Myanmar
- Philippines
- Singapore
- Thailand
- Timor-Leste
- Vietnam

== Medal table ==
* Host nation (Cambodia)

Rank	Nation	Gold	Silver	Bronze	Total
1	Singapore	22	15	10	47
2	Vietnam	7	3	7	17
3	Thailand	4	11	7	22
4	Indonesia	3	1	3	7
5	Philippines	2	6	8	16
6	Malaysia	1	3	4	8
Totals (6 entries)		39	39	39	117

== Medalist ==
Key
AS	Asian record	GR	Southeast Asian Games record	NR	National record	OQT	Paris 2024 Qualification

=== Men ===
Event	Gold		Silver		Bronze	
50 m freestyle	Jonathan Tan; Singapore	21.95; OQT (Note: In the Heats, he set a new GR, NR & achieved OQT of 21.91s)	Teong Tzen Wei; Singapore	22.50	Luong Jérémie Loïc Nino; Vietnam	22.84
100 m freestyle	Jonathan Tan; Singapore	48.80	Quah Zheng Wen; Singapore	48.99	Luong Jérémie Loïc Nino; Vietnam	49.69
200 m freestyle	Khiew Hoe Yean; Malaysia	1:48.91	Dulyawat Kaewsriyong; Thailand	1:49.29 NR	Nguyễn Huy Hoàng; Vietnam	1:49.31
400 m freestyle	Nguyễn Huy Hoàng; Vietnam	3:49.50	Khiew Hoe Yean; Malaysia	3:50.39	Glen Lim Jun Wei; Singapore	3:53.78
1500 m freestyle	Nguyễn Huy Hoàng; Vietnam	15:11.24	Nguyễn Hữu Kim Sơn; Vietnam	15:35.21	Glen Lim Jun Wei; Singapore	15:40.49
50 m backstroke	I Gede Siman Sudartawa; Indonesia	25.16	Jerard Jacinto; Philippines	25.56 NR	Quah Zheng Wen; Singapore	25.61
100 m backstroke	Quah Zheng Wen; Singapore	55.22	Farrel Armandio Tangkas; Indonesia	55.80	Jerard Jacinto; Philippines	55.99
200 m backstroke	Tonnam Kanteemool; Thailand	02:01.29 NR	Trần Hưng Nguyên; Vietnam	02:01.34 NR	Khiew Hoe Yean; Malaysia	02:01.74
50 m breaststroke	Felix Viktor Iberle; Indonesia	27.70	Nicholas Mahabir; Singapore	27.91; NR	Muhammad Dwiky Raharjo; Indonesia	28.01
100 m breaststroke	Phạm Thanh Bảo; Vietnam	1:00.97; GR NR	Nicholas Mahabir; Singapore	1:01.22	Maximillian Ang; Singapore	1:02.21
200 m breaststroke	Phạm Thanh Bảo; Vietnam	2:11.45; GR NR	Nicholas Mahabir; Singapore	2:13.95	Maximillian Ang; Singapore	2:14.30
50 m butterfly	Mikkel Lee; Singapore	23.45	Teong Tzen Wei; Singapore	23.67	Jarod Hatch; Philippines	23.89 NR
100 m butterfly	Quah Zheng Wen; Singapore	52.04	Teong Tzen Wei; Singapore	52.60	Jarod Hatch; Philippines	52.91 NR
200 m butterfly	Ong Jung Yi; Singapore	1:59.44	Navaphat Wongcharoen; Thailand	1:59.64	Hồ Nguyễn Duy Khoa; Vietnam	2:00.60
200 m individual medley	Trần Hưng Nguyên; Vietnam	2:01.28	Dulyawat Kaewsriyong; Thailand	2:02.25 NR	Zachary Tan; Singapore	2:02.42
400 m individual medley	Trần Hưng Nguyên; Vietnam	4:19.12	Nguyễn Quang Thuấn; Vietnam	4:21.03	Tan Khai Xin; Malaysia	4:23.24; NR
4×100 m freestyle relay	Singapore; Jonathan Tan (48.90); Mikkel Lee (49.73); Darren Chua (50.26); Quah Zheng Wen (48.46)	3:17.35	Malaysia; Lim Yin Chuen (50.57); Arvin Chahal (49.64); Khiew Hoe Yean (50.07); Terence Ng (50.33)	3:20.61; NR	Vietnam; Trần Hưng Nguyên (50.87); Ngô Đình Chuyền (50.32); Hoàng Quý Phước (49.90); Jeremie Loic Nino Lương (50.00)	3:21.09 NR
4×200 m freestyle relay	Vietnam; Trần Hưng Nguyên (1:48.59); Nguyễn Hữu Kim Sơn (1:51.25); Nguyễn Huy Hoàng (1:49.38); Hoàng Quý Phước (1:49.29)	7:18.51	Singapore; Jonathan Tan (1:49.66); Glen Lim (1:48.57); Ardi Azman (1:50.79); Darren Chua (1:52.48)	7:21.50	Malaysia; Arvin Chahal (1:50.13); Khiew Hoe Yean (1:48.84); Tan Khai Xin (1:52.66); Lim Yin Chuen (1:49.92)	7:21.55
4×100 m medley relay	Singapore; Quah Zheng Wen (55.31); Nicholas Mahabir (1:00.68); Teong Tzen Wei (52.79); Jonathan Tan (48.67)	3:37.45; GR, NR	Thailand; Tonnam Kanteemool (57.04); Thanonchai Janruksa (1:03.20); Navaphat Wongcharoen (53.14); Dulyawat Kaewsriyong (48.37)	3:41.75 NR	Indonesia; Farrel Armandio Tangkas (56.39); Muhammad Dwiky Raharjo (1:02.18); Joe Aditya Wijaya Kurniawan (53.12); Erick Ahmad Fathoni (50.23)	3:41.92

=== Women ===
Event	Gold		Silver		Bronze	
50 m freestyle	Quah Ting Wen; Singapore	25.04; GR	Amanda Lim; Singapore	25.16	Jenjira Srisaard; Thailand	25.32
100 m freestyle	Quah Ting Wen; Singapore	55.83	Jasmine Alkhaldi; Philippines	56.12	Nguyễn Thúy Hiền; Vietnam	56.42
200 m freestyle	Gan Ching Hwee; Singapore	2:01.76	Kamonchanok Kwanmuang; Thailand	2:02.21	Chan Zi Yi; Singapore	2:02.94
400 m freestyle	Gan Ching Hwee; Singapore	4:15.17	Ashley Lim Yi Xuan; Singapore	4:17.16	Kamonchanok Kwanmuang; Thailand; Võ Thị Mỹ Tiên; Vietnam	4:21.79
800 m freestyle	Gan Ching Hwee; Singapore	8:41.05	Ashley Lim Yi Xuan; Singapore	8:46.88	Võ Thị Mỹ Tiên; Vietnam	8:56.07
50 m backstroke	Masniari Wolf; Indonesia	28.89; GR NR	Saovanee Boonanphai; Thailand	28.97 NR	Teia Salvino; Philippines	28.99
100 m backstroke	Teia Salvino; Philippines	1:01.64 NR	Faith Elizabeth Khoo; Singapore	1:03.68	Angel Gabriella Yus; Indonesia	1:03.71
200 m backstroke	Xiandi Chua; Philippines	2:13.20; GR NR	Chloe Isleta; Philippines	2:16.19	Fonpray Yamsuan; Thailand	2:17.95
50 m breaststroke	Jenjira Srisaard; Thailand	31.22; GR NR	Letitia Sim; Singapore	31.62	Phee Jinq En; Malaysia	31.94
100 m breaststroke	Letitia Sim; Singapore	1:07.94; GR	Phee Jinq En; Malaysia	1:09.59	Christie May Mun; Singapore	1:10.94
200 m breaststroke	Letitia Sim; Singapore	2:28.49; GR, NR	Phiangkhwan Pawapotako; Thailand	2:32.44	Christie May Mun; Singapore	2:32.60
50 m butterfly	Jenjira Srisaard; Thailand	26.65	Quah Ting Wen; Singapore	26.66	Jasmine Alkhaldi; Philippines	27.02
100 m butterfly	Quah Jing Wen; Singapore	59.02	Quah Ting Wen; Singapore	59.51	Jasmine Alkhaldi; Philippines	01:00.45
200 m butterfly	Quah Jing Wen; Singapore	2:10.63	Kamonchanok Kwanmuang; Thailand	2:11.56 NR	Jinjutha Pholjamjumrus; Thailand	2:14.37
200 m individual medley	Letitia Sim; Singapore	2:14.49; NR	Kamonchanok Kwanmuang; Thailand	2:16.16	Quah Jing Wen; Singapore	2:16.39
400 m individual medley	Kamonchanok Kwanmuang; Thailand	04:47.25 NR	Jinjutha Pholjamjumrus; Thailand	04:49.33	Xiandi Chua; Philippines	04:52.08
4×100 m freestyle relay	Singapore; Quah Ting Wen (55.85); Nur Marina Chan (56.19); Quah Jing Wen (56.16); Amanda Lim (56.09)	3:44.29	Philippines; Jasmine Alkhaldi; Xiandi Chua; Miranda Renner; Teia Salvino	3:47.96	Thailand; Jenjira Srisaard; Kamonchanok Kwanmuang; Kornkarnjana Sapianchai; Mia Millar	3:50.01
4×200 m freestyle relay	Singapore; Gan Ching Hwee (2:01.81); Ashley Lim Yi Xuan (2:02.89); Chan Zi Yi (2:03.93); Quah Ting Wen (2:04.17)	8:12.80	Thailand; Kamonchanok Kwanmuang; Napatsawan Jaritkla; Jinjutha Pholjamjumrus; Kornkarnjana Sapianchai	8:17.95	Philippines; Chloe Isleta; Teia Salvino; Jasmine Alkhaldi; Xiandi Chua	8:19.94
4×100 m medley relay	Singapore; Faith Khoo (1:04.23); Letitia Sim (1:07.32); Quah Jing Wen (59.10); Quah Ting Wen (56.32)	4:06.97; GR, NR	Philippines; Teia Salvino; Thanya Angelyn Cacho; Jasmine Alkhaldi; Miranda Renner	4:11.81	Thailand; Saovanee Boonanphai; Phurichaya Junyamitree; Kamonchanok Kwanmuang; Jenjira Srisaard	4:14.06

=== Mixed ===
Event	Gold		Silver		Bronze	
4×100 m medley relay	Singapore; Quah Zheng Wen (55.72); Nicholas Mahabir (1:00.80); Quah Jing Wen (58.88); Quah Ting Wen (56.32)	3:51.72; GR, NR	Philippines; Jerard Jacinto; Thanya Angelyn Cacho; Jarod Hatch; Jasmine Alkhaldi	3:57.01	Thailand; Saovanee Boonamphai; Dulyawat Kaewsriyong; Navaphat Wongcharoen; Kamonchanok Kwanmuang	3:58.18
