= Xiangqi at the 2023 SEA Games =

- Venue: Royal University of Phnom Penh
- Location: Phnom Penh, Cambodia
- Dates: 12–15 May 2023

Xiangqi competitions at the 2023 SEA Games took place at Royal University of Phnom Penh in Phnom Penh, Cambodia from 12 to 15 May 2023. This was the second time this sport was competed in the Southeast Asian Games.

== Medal table ==
* Host nation (Cambodia)

Rank	Nation	Gold	Silver	Bronze	Total
1	Vietnam	2	2	1	5
2	Singapore	2	1	2	5
3	Malaysia	0	1	2	3
4	Cambodia*	0	0	3	3
Totals (4 entries)		4	4	8	16

== Medalists ==
Event	Gold	Silver	Bronze
Men's standard single	Lại Lý Huynh; Vietnam	Alvin Woo Tsung Han; Singapore	Nguyễn Thành Bảo; Vietnam
Men's standard single	Lại Lý Huynh; Vietnam	Alvin Woo Tsung Han; Singapore	Keung On Chan; Cambodia
Women's standard single	Lan Huong Ngo; Singapore	Lê Thị Kim Loan; Vietnam	Jee Xin Ru; Malaysia
Women's standard single	Lan Huong Ngo; Singapore	Lê Thị Kim Loan; Vietnam	Fiona Tan Min Fang; Singapore
Men's rapid team	Vietnam; Đặng Cửu Tùng Lân; Nguyễn Quang Nhật	Malaysia; Tan Yu Huat; Yeoh Thean Jern	Cambodia; Heng Chamnan; Yu Kuen Chiu
Men's rapid team	Vietnam; Đặng Cửu Tùng Lân; Nguyễn Quang Nhật	Malaysia; Tan Yu Huat; Yeoh Thean Jern	Singapore; Junyang Ng; Low Yi Hao
Men's blitz team	Singapore; Alvin Woo Tsung Han; Low Yi Hao	Vietnam; Chu Tuấn Hải; Hà Văn Tiến	Malaysia; Sim Yip How; Yeoh Thean Jern
Men's blitz team	Singapore; Alvin Woo Tsung Han; Low Yi Hao	Vietnam; Chu Tuấn Hải; Hà Văn Tiến	Cambodia; Heng Chamnan; Keung On Chan
