= Boxing at the 2023 SEA Games =

Boxing competitions

- Venue: Chroy Changvar Convention Centre
- Location: Phnom Penh, Cambodia
- Dates: 6–14 May
- Competitors: 95 from 10 nations

Boxing competitions at the 2023 SEA Games took place in Chroy Changvar Convention Centre in Phnom Penh, Cambodia.

== Medal table ==
* Host nation (Cambodia)

Rank	Nation	Gold	Silver	Bronze	Total
1	Thailand	9	2	1	12
2	Philippines	4	5	1	10
3	Vietnam	2	1	3	6
4	Cambodia*	1	3	5	9
5	Indonesia	0	5	3	8
6	Myanmar	0	0	6	6
7	Laos	0	0	3	3
7	Malaysia	0	0	3	3
7	Singapore	0	0	3	3
10	Timor-Leste	0	0	2	2
Totals (10 entries)		16	16	30	62

== Medalists ==
=== Men ===
Event	Gold	Silver	Bronze
Mini flyweight (48 kg)	Natthapong Thuamcharoen; Thailand	Dio Koebanu; Indonesia	Khamphouvanh Khamsathone; Laos
Mini flyweight (48 kg)	Natthapong Thuamcharoen; Thailand	Dio Koebanu; Indonesia	Nguyễn Linh Phụng; Vietnam
Flyweight (51 kg)	Thanarat Saengphet; Thailand	Rogen Ladon; Philippines	Lin Htut Paing; Myanmar
Flyweight (51 kg)	Thanarat Saengphet; Thailand	Rogen Ladon; Philippines	Muhd Abdul Qaiyum Ariffin; Malaysia
Bantamweight (54 kg)	Carlo Paalam; Philippines	Aldoms Sugoro; Indonesia	Edegar Foe Quintas Da Silva; Timor-Leste
Bantamweight (54 kg)	Carlo Paalam; Philippines	Aldoms Sugoro; Indonesia	Trần Văn An; Vietnam
Featherweight (57 kg)	Ian Clark Bautista; Philippines	Asri Udin; Indonesia	Naing Latt; Myanmar
Featherweight (57 kg)	Ian Clark Bautista; Philippines	Asri Udin; Indonesia	Sivixay Thammavongsa; Laos
Lightweight (60 kg)	Paul Bascon; Philippines	Rujakran Juntrong; Thailand	Davit Touch; Cambodia
Lightweight (60 kg)	Paul Bascon; Philippines	Rujakran Juntrong; Thailand	Muhd Ridzuan Johari; Malaysia
Light welterweight (63.5 kg)	Somchay Wongsuwan; Thailand	Ven Ratha; Cambodia	Farrand Papendang; Indonesia
Light welterweight (63.5 kg)	Somchay Wongsuwan; Thailand	Ven Ratha; Cambodia	Saw Bwe Klo; Myanmar
Welterweight (67 kg)	Bunjong Sinsiri; Thailand	Norlan Petecio; Philippines	Velvan Tan Jun Jie; Singapore
Welterweight (67 kg)	Bunjong Sinsiri; Thailand	Norlan Petecio; Philippines	Kyaw Min Oo; Myanmar
Light middleweight (71 kg)	Bùi Phước Tùng; Vietnam	Atichai Phoemsap; Thailand	Delio Anzaqeci Mouzinho; Timor-Leste
Light middleweight (71 kg)	Bùi Phước Tùng; Vietnam	Atichai Phoemsap; Thailand	Sarohatua Lumbantobing; Indonesia
Light heavyweight (80 kg)	Weerapon Jongjoho; Thailand	John Marvin; Philippines	Muhammad Danish Husli; Singapore
Light heavyweight (80 kg)	Weerapon Jongjoho; Thailand	John Marvin; Philippines	Anvar Nasredinov; Cambodia
Cruiserweight (86 kg)	Jakkapong Yomkhot; Thailand	Maikhel Roberrd Muskita; Indonesia	Indran Rama Khrisnan; Malaysia
Cruiserweight (86 kg)	Jakkapong Yomkhot; Thailand	Maikhel Roberrd Muskita; Indonesia	Ong Phearak; Cambodia
Heavyweight (92 kg)	Abdulla Rajapov; Cambodia	Nguyễn Mạnh Chương; Vietnam	Markus Tongco; Philippines
Heavyweight (92 kg)	Abdulla Rajapov; Cambodia	Nguyễn Mạnh Chương; Vietnam	Kitipat Prueksena; Thailand

=== Women ===
Event	Gold	Silver	Bronze
Bantamweight (54 kg)	Jutamas Jitpong; Thailand	Irish Magno; Philippines	Aishagul Yeleubayeva; Cambodia
Bantamweight (54 kg)	Jutamas Jitpong; Thailand	Irish Magno; Philippines	Novita Sinadia; Indonesia
Featherweight (57 kg)	Nesthy Petecio; Philippines	Ratna Sari Devi; Indonesia	Vy Sreysros; Cambodia
Featherweight (57 kg)	Nesthy Petecio; Philippines	Ratna Sari Devi; Indonesia	Shu Myat Noe; Myanmar
Light welterweight (63 kg)	Hà Thị Lĩnh; Vietnam	Riza Pasuit; Philippines	Kay Thwe Nyein; Myanmar
Light welterweight (63 kg)	Hà Thị Lĩnh; Vietnam	Riza Pasuit; Philippines	Nur Sabrina Mohd Faizal; Singapore
Light middleweight (69 kg)	Janjaem Suwannapheng; Thailand	Vy Sreykhouch; Cambodia	Panee Bounmeexai; Laos
Middleweight (75 kg)	Baison Manikon; Thailand	Diday Dana; Cambodia	Nguyễn Thị Phương Hoài; Vietnam
