= Field hockey at the 2023 SEA Games =

- Venue: Morodok Techo National Stadium
- Location: Phnom Penh, Cambodia
- Date: 9–16 May
- Nations: 5

Champions
- Men: Malaysia
- Women: Malaysia

The hockey competition at the 2023 SEA Games featured two medal events and the competition took place at the Morodok Techo National Stadium, Phnom Penh from 9–16 May 2023.

== Participants ==
A total of 5 nations took part of this competition.

- Cambodia
- Indonesia
- Malaysia
- Singapore
- Thailand

== Medal summary ==
=== Medal table ===
Key

* Host nation (Cambodia)

Rank	Nation	Gold	Silver	Bronze	Total
1	Malaysia	2	0	0	2
2	Singapore	0	1	1	2
2	Thailand	0	1	1	2
4	Indonesia	0	0	2	2
Totals (4 entries)		2	2	4	8

=== Medalists ===
Event	Gold	Silver	Bronze
Men's tournament	Malaysia; Mohamad Rafaizul Saini; Muhammad Najib Abu Hassan; Wan Muhammad Najmie; Muhamad Ramadan Rosli; Faris Harizan; Perabu Tangaraja; Azmilmuizzudin Misron; Harris Iskandar Osman; Mughni Kamal; Alfarico Lance Liau Jr; Muhammad Addy Jazmi Jamlus; Shahmie Irfan Suhaimi; Muhammad Danish Aiman; Mohd Zaimi Mat Deris; Andywalfian Jeffrynus; Amirul Hamizan Azahar; Muhammad Adam Ashraf Johari; Muhammad Danish Danial	Singapore; Xuan Wee Wei; Kent Loo; Fariz Basir; Enrico Marican; Jaspal Grewal; Dineshraj Naidu; Darren Sia; Silas Noor; Ashriq Zul'kepli; Ramanan Thulasiram; Abu Nufail; Lee Yap Wee; Dawnraj Rengasamy; Hariraj Naidu; Zaki Zulkarnan; Bazil Kahar; Jeremiah Balakrishnan; Gugan Sandran	Indonesia; Rumaropen Julius; Muhamad Fadli; Alam Asrul; Rahmad Astri; Atwo Frank; Asasi Ahdan; Ardam; Fajar Alam; Priliandro Revo; Prastyo Alfandy; Efendi Jerry; Raditya Derangga; Fathur Mochamad; Wibowo Arthur; Maulana Nurul; Al Akbar Abdullah; Al Ardh Aulia; Guntara Andrea
Men's tournament	Malaysia; Mohamad Rafaizul Saini; Muhammad Najib Abu Hassan; Wan Muhammad Najmie; Muhamad Ramadan Rosli; Faris Harizan; Perabu Tangaraja; Azmilmuizzudin Misron; Harris Iskandar Osman; Mughni Kamal; Alfarico Lance Liau Jr; Muhammad Addy Jazmi Jamlus; Shahmie Irfan Suhaimi; Muhammad Danish Aiman; Mohd Zaimi Mat Deris; Andywalfian Jeffrynus; Amirul Hamizan Azahar; Muhammad Adam Ashraf Johari; Muhammad Danish Danial	Singapore; Xuan Wee Wei; Kent Loo; Fariz Basir; Enrico Marican; Jaspal Grewal; Dineshraj Naidu; Darren Sia; Silas Noor; Ashriq Zul'kepli; Ramanan Thulasiram; Abu Nufail; Lee Yap Wee; Dawnraj Rengasamy; Hariraj Naidu; Zaki Zulkarnan; Bazil Kahar; Jeremiah Balakrishnan; Gugan Sandran	Thailand; Wistawas Phosawang; Kraiwich Thawichat; Tanwa Yongthong; Kritsada Chueamkaew; Sadakorn Vimuttanon; Aphiwat Thanperm; Ratthawit Khamkong; Worawut Kaeochianghwang; Chutiphong Samoema; Kritsana Phumee; Nattapong Trisom; Borirak Harapan; Chanachol Rungniyom; Suriya Kasonbua; Wirawat Singthong; Thanakrit Boon-Art; Tanakit Juntakian; Somrat Boontam
Women's tournament	Malaysia; Siti Zalia Nasir; Nuraini Abdul Rashid; Nur Insyirah Effarizal; Dayang Nuramirah Abang; Azhari Azmyra; Juliani Mohamad Din; Siti Nur Arfah Mohd Nor; Nur Afiqah Syahzani Azhar; Mashitah Ab Khalid; Nurul Faezah Khalim; Wan Norfaiezah Md Saiuti; Fatin Shafikah Mahd Sukri; Nur Syuhada Suhaimi; Nurul Fatin Fatiah Azman; Khairunnisa Ayuni Mohd; Nuramirah Zulkifli; Nurmaizatul Hanim Syafi; Kirandeep Kaur Gurdip	Thailand; Kawintida Wisuttiprapa; Chanthakan Phanchanang; Jenjira Kijpakdee; Suwapat Konthong; Sirikwan Wongkeaw; Parichart Phopool; Kunjira Inpa; Kornkanok Sanpoung; Onuma Doungsuda; Natthakarn Aunjai; Supansa Samanso; Atittaya Sumphowthong; Songkran Pasawat; Anongnat Piresram; Siraya Yimkrajang; Watsana Saetan; Kessarin Kamphol	Singapore; Tong Liu Yu; Patricia Collera; Jolene Ng; Puay Ho; Sofia Saban Nurul; Johana Hajaratih; Toh Li Min; Shubhaa Manimaran; Laura Tan; Cheryll Chia; Felissa Lai; Phylicia Tanandika; Sardonna Ng; Megan Francis; Valerie Koh; Amani Sherie; Valerie Sim; Nithira Manimaran
Women's tournament	Malaysia; Siti Zalia Nasir; Nuraini Abdul Rashid; Nur Insyirah Effarizal; Dayang Nuramirah Abang; Azhari Azmyra; Juliani Mohamad Din; Siti Nur Arfah Mohd Nor; Nur Afiqah Syahzani Azhar; Mashitah Ab Khalid; Nurul Faezah Khalim; Wan Norfaiezah Md Saiuti; Fatin Shafikah Mahd Sukri; Nur Syuhada Suhaimi; Nurul Fatin Fatiah Azman; Khairunnisa Ayuni Mohd; Nuramirah Zulkifli; Nurmaizatul Hanim Syafi; Kirandeep Kaur Gurdip	Thailand; Kawintida Wisuttiprapa; Chanthakan Phanchanang; Jenjira Kijpakdee; Suwapat Konthong; Sirikwan Wongkeaw; Parichart Phopool; Kunjira Inpa; Kornkanok Sanpoung; Onuma Doungsuda; Natthakarn Aunjai; Supansa Samanso; Atittaya Sumphowthong; Songkran Pasawat; Anongnat Piresram; Siraya Yimkrajang; Watsana Saetan; Kessarin Kamphol	Indonesia; Greschela; Widiyana Saruli; Dwi Aulia Rahma; Adriana Asa; Lispa; Yuanita Suwito; Since Novita; Nur Anisa; Melinda; Nisa Indira; Sismya Winarsih; Annur El Islamy; Adna Fika; Salma Maulani; Selly Florentina; Paulina Ronsumbre; Dian Wildiani; Ruth Bransik
