= Sailing at the 2023 SEA Games =

- Venue: Sokha Beach
- Location: Sihanoukville, Cambodia
- Dates: 2–8 May 2023
- Nations: 6

The sailing competition at the 2023 SEA Games featured nine events and the competition took place at Sokha Beach in Sihanoukville, Cambodia from 2 to 8 May 2023.

== Participating nations ==
- Cambodia
- Malaysia
- Philippines
- Singapore
- Thailand
- Vietnam

== Medal table ==
* Host nation (Cambodia)

Rank	Nation	Gold	Silver	Bronze	Total
1	Thailand	4	2	1	7
2	Singapore	3	4	0	7
3	Malaysia	2	1	4	7
4	Cambodia*	0	1	2	3
4	Philippines	0	1	2	3
Totals (5 entries)		9	9	9	27

== Medalists ==
=== Men ===
Event	Gold	Silver	Bronze
ILCA 7	Ryan Lo; Singapore	Arthit Mikhail Romanyk; Thailand	Muhammad Faizal Ahmad Asri; Malaysia
Windfoil IQ:Foil	Ek Boonsawad; Thailand	Elkan Reshawn Oh; Singapore	John Harold Abarintos Madrigal; Philippines
Windfoil IQ:Foil Youth	Passapong Lianglam; Thailand	Andrei Frego Tugade; Philippines	Keo Peanon; Cambodia
Windsurfing RS:One	Izry Hafiezy Fitry Azry; Malaysia	Keo Phearun; Cambodia	Denver John Centino Castillo; Philippines
Windsurfing RS:X	Muhammad Hafizin Mansor; Malaysia	Jayson Jian Sen Tan; Singapore	Sem Brospov; Cambodia

=== Women ===
Event	Gold	Silver	Bronze
ILCA 6	Thorfun Boonnak; Thailand	Jania Ang; Singapore	Nur Adlina Nasreen Mohd Nasri; Malaysia

=== Mixed ===
Event	Gold	Silver	Bronze
Optimist	Thailand; Chanatip Tongglum; Patcharaphan Ongkaloy	Singapore; Cheryl Heng Xi Yong; Ethan Chia Han Wei	Malaysia; Muhd Hilfi Nafael Mohd Hasrizan; Sara Amanda Mohd Noor Azman

=== Open ===
Event	Gold	Silver	Bronze
ILCA 4	Isaac Goh; Singapore	Thanapat Siricharoen; Thailand	Muhammad Asnawi Iqbal Adam; Malaysia
29er	Singapore; Ellyn Jiamin Tan; Teck Pin Chia	Malaysia; Abdul Latif Mansor; Muhammad Dhiauddin Rozaini	Thailand; Suthon Yampinid; Sutida Poonpat
