= Singapore at the 2023 SEA Games =

- IOC code: SGP
- NOC: Singapore National Olympic Council
- Website: www.singaporeolympics.com

in Phnom Penh, Cambodia
- Competitors: 558 in 30 sports
- Flag bearer: Terry Tay (Gymnastics)
- Medals Ranked 6th: Gold 51 Silver 43 Bronze 64 Total 158

SEA Games appearances (overview)
- 1959; 1961; 1965; 1967; 1969; 1971; 1973; 1975; 1977; 1979; 1981; 1983; 1985; 1987; 1989; 1991; 1993; 1995; 1997; 1999; 2001; 2003; 2005; 2007; 2009; 2011; 2013; 2015; 2017; 2019; 2021; 2023; 2025; 2027; 2029

Singapore sent a delegation to compete at the 2023 SEA Games held in Phnom Penh, Cambodia from 5 to 17 May 2023.

The team were led by chef-de-mission Dr Hing Siong Chen, a member of the Singapore National Olympic Council’s (SNOC) Executive Committee and President of the Singapore Cycling Federation, assisted by deputies Lim Tong Hai and Jasmine Yeong-Nathan – both were national representatives in football and bowling respectively.

== Competitors ==
An initial 517 athletes were preliminary selected to represent Singapore across 27 sports. On 28 February 2023, more athletes were selected following appeals to the Singapore National Olympic Council (SNOC). A total of 558 athletes, including 260 debutants, competed in 30 sports. Terry Tay from Men’s Gymnastics was the flag bearer.

On 1 March, Joseph Schooling, who was included in the initial selection, announced he would withdraw from the Games for personal reasons.

On 26 April, fencer Samson Lee reportedly missed three training sessions due to the birth of his child, his father’s hospitalisation and work commitments. As a result, he was dropped from the team for the Games. There would be no replacement for Lee in the squad, leaving Bron Sheum, Si To Jian Tong and Simon Lee to represent Singapore for fencing.

=== Cycling ===
Singapore entered ten cyclists, Calvin Sim, Tong Khoon Fung, Darren Lim, Riyadh Hakim, Yeo Boon Kiak, Arfan Faisal, Chelsie Tan, Luo Yiwei, Elizabeth Liau and Faye Foo in the Games.

=== Finswimming ===
Singapore entered a women's team comprising Bernice Ting, Jamie Ang, Vanessa Ong and Jovita Ho for the 4x200m surface relay finswimming event.

== Incident ==
On 1 July 2024, the SNOC and Sport Singapore (SportSG) formed a committee of inquiry to investigate allegations that the Singapore Underwater Federation (SUF) had falsified results during the selection process for the women's 4×200 m surface relay finswimming event at the 2023 SEA Games. The investigation, completed in February 2025, found that the results had been falsified. As SUF was already suspended by the World Underwater Federation, SportSG subsequently suspended support for the involved administrators and athletes, as well as the National Registry of Coaches memberships of the coaches involved. A police report was lodged on 18 March 2025 with SNOC and SportSG announcing the incident the next day.

SUF vice-president and head coach Ho Ho Huat had known since December 2022 that the 2023 SEA Games would reduce the number of finswimming events. In January 2023, Ho sent five male athletes to a competition in Malaysia held for Malaysian swimmers. While able to compete in the competitions, no official results were issued for the Singaporean swimmers. Ho subsequently instructed coach Muhammad Faiz Suhaimi to falsify results indicating that six female athletes had competed in various events and achieved qualifying times. Faiz falsified the data under pressure from Ho on 18 January, resulting in four athletes being selected for the SEA Games based on the falsified results, while two others qualified on merit in other events. The SNOC incurred S$15,700 in expenses to send the six athletes to the Games. In December 2023, Ho was removed from SUF which leads to Faiz informing a whistleblower of the falsification in January 2024. On 12 March 2026, Faiz, Ho and former coach Gary Lee Quan were charged with conspiracy to commit forgery for the purpose of cheating. Faiz and Ho were each charged with three counts, while Lee was charged with two. On 14 September, Faiz was sentenced to one week's imprisonment after admitting to falsifying the results. Both prosecution and defence agreed a fine is sufficient but District Judge Ong Luan Tze decided a short jail sentence is still required.

== Games summary ==
=== Summary ===
Singapore won 51 golds medals at the Games with a total tally of 158 medals won, placing the country sixth at the medal table. Singapore topped the medal tally in swimming, fencing and table tennis.

In swimming, the team achieved their best ever results of 47 medals; inclusive of 22 gold medals. Singapore also won their 1000th SEA Games Gold medal through the women's 4x100m freestyle relay team. Swimmer Quah Ting Wen achieved a feat of 60 gold medals in her career spanning two decades.

In athletics, Shanti Pereira becomes the first Singaporean to win both the 100 and 200m while Ang Chen Xiang wins Singapore's first gold in the hurdles since 1967.

The men's water polo team wrestle back the gold medal that they held for 27 consecutive times until 2019. The fencing team dominated their opponents winning seven gold medals out of a possible 12. Also, the women’s floorball team wins the gold medal for three consecutive times at the Games.

Swimmer Quah Ting Wen, with Cambodian vovinam exponent Pal Chhor Raksmy, received the best athlete award at the closing ceremony of the SEA Games.

=== Medals by sports ===
Medals by sport
Sport	1st place, gold medalist(s)	2nd place, silver medalist(s)	3rd place, bronze medalist(s)	Total
Athletics	3	2	5	10
Badminton	0	0	3	3
Basketball	0	0	0	0
Billiards	0	2	0	2
Boxing	0	0	3	3
Chess - Xiangqi	2	1	2	5
Cycling	0	0	0	0
Cricket	1	0	2	3
Diving (Aquatics)	0	0	2	2
E-Sports	1	0	1	2
Endurance Race (Aquathlon, Duathlon, Triathlon)	0	0	2	2
Fencing	7	3	6	16
Finswimming (Aquatics)	0	0	0	0
Floorball	1	0	1	2
Football	0	0	0	0
Golf	0	0	0	0
Gymnastics	0	1	0	1
Hockey	0	1	2	3
Judo	0	0	4	4
Martial Arts	1	1	2	4
Pencak Silat	2	3	5	10
Pétanque	0	0	0	0
Sailing	3	4	0	7
Sepak Takraw	0	0	1	1
Swimming (Aquatics)	22	15	10	47
Table Tennis	4	2	3	9
Taekwondo	0	1	4	5
Tennis	0	0	0	0
Traditional Boat Race	0	0	0	0
Volleyball	0	0	0	0
Water Polo	1	1	0	2
Wrestling	1	3	5	9
Wushu	2	3	1	6
Total	51	43	64	158

=== Medals by date ===
Medals by date
Day	Date	1st place, gold medalist(s)	2nd place, silver medalist(s)	3rd place, bronze medalist(s)	Total
-1	4 May	0	0	0	0
0	5 May	Opening ceremony			
1	6 May	5	2	4	11
2	7 May	4	4	8	16
3	8 May	7	5	2	14
4	9 May	4	5	7	16
5	10 May	7	7	10	24
6	11 May	9	6	6	21
7	12 May	2	4	4	10
8	13 May	3	1	4	8
9	14 May	1	3	9	13
10	15 May	3	2	5	10
11	16 May	6	4	5	15
Total		51	43	64	158

=== Medalists ===
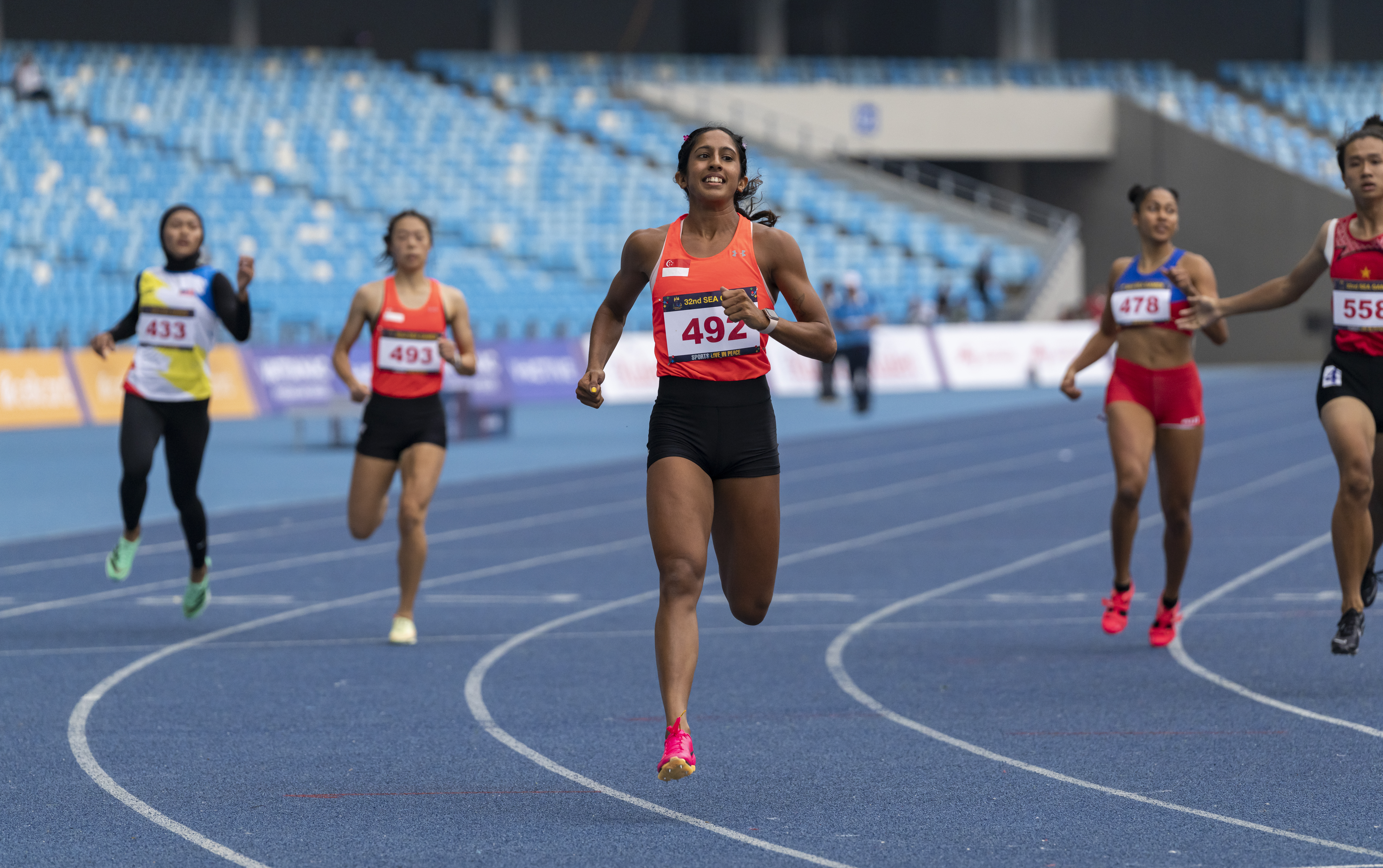
Shanti Pereira winning the 200 metres; she would go on to win the 100 metres as well, becoming the first Singapore sprinter to complete the sprint double at the SEA Games

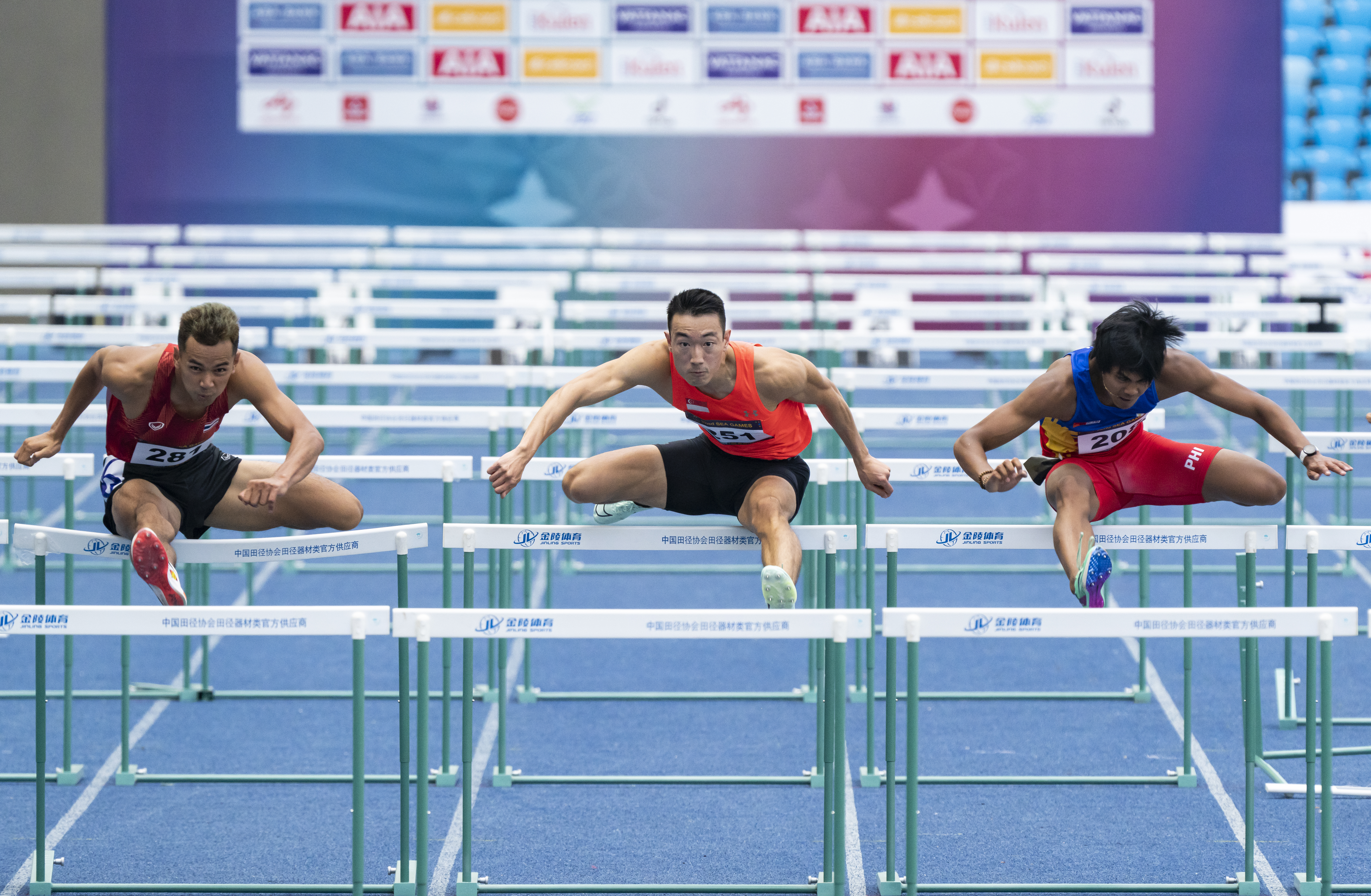
Ang Chen Xiang won Singapore's first 110 metres hurdles at the SEA Games since 1967

Medalist are arranged in order of colour and date.

Medal	Athlete	Sport	Event	Date
Gold	Edlyn Basil Heng; Daphne Tan En Qi; Tan Hui Zhi; Ong Jia Min; Lim Jie Ying; Hoo Mei Hui; Michelle Lok; Nasha Jeffri; Shazana Mohd Noor; Shermaine Goh; Shannon Yeo; Siti Nurhaliza; Ong Swee Ling; Amanda Yeap; Foo Wen Xin; Xuan Yeo; Shawn Yee Yun; Mindy Lim	Floorball	Women's team	16 May
Gold	Isaac Quek	Table Tennis	Men's singles	16 May
Gold	Zeng Jian	Table Tennis	Women's singles	16 May
Gold	Elle Koh; Kiria Tikanah; Rebecca Ong; Filzah Hidayah	Fencing	Women's Epee	16 May
Gold	Timothy Loh Yu	Wrestling	Men's freestyle 125KG	16 May
Gold	Men's team	Water Polo	Men's team	16 May
Gold	Alvin Woo; Low Yi Hao	Xiangqi	Men's Blitz Team	15 May
Gold	Maxine Wong; Cheung Kemei; Tay Yu Ling; Tiffany Seet	Fencing	Women's Foil	15 May
Gold	Men's team	Cricket	Men’s 6s	15 May
Gold	Isaac Quek; Koen Pang	Table Tennis	Men’s Doubles	14 May
Gold	Ngo Lan Huong	Xiangqi	Women's Standard	13 May
Gold	Elle Koh	Fencing	Women's Epee	13 May
Gold	Samuel Elijah Robson	Fencing	Men's Foil	13 May
Gold	Shanti Pereira	Athletics	Women's 100M	12 May
Gold	Maxine Wong	Fencing	Women's Foil	12 May
Gold	Faith Khoo; Letitia Sim; Quah Jing Wen; Quah Ting Wen	Swimming	Women's 4x100m medley relay	11 May
Gold	Ong Jung Yi	Swimming	Men's 200m butterfly	11 May
Gold	Gan Ching Hwee	Swimming	Women's 800M Freestyle	11 May
Gold	Clarence Chew; Koen Pang; Isaac Quek; Ethan Poh; Beh Kun Ting	Table tennis	Men's team	11 May
Gold	Si To Jian Tong	Fencing	Men's Epee	11 May
Gold	Juliet Heng Jie Min	Fencing	Women's Sabre	11 May
Gold	Kimberly Ong	Wushu	Women's daoshu + Gunshu	11 May
Gold	Jowen Lim	Wushu	Men's daoshu + Gunshu	11 May
Gold	Yeoh Chun Ting; Ingram Tan Ying Xuan; Marcus Tan; Rodman Yap; Tidus Goh; Ayrton Bryan Soh	E-Sports	Valorant (PC)	11 May
Gold	Jonathan Tan; Mikkel Lee; Darren Chua; Quah Zheng Wen	Swimming	Men’s 4x100M Freestyle Relay	10 May
Gold	Quah Ting Wen; Ashley Lim; Gan Ching Hwee; Chan Zi Yi	Swimming	Women's 4x200M Freestyle Relay	10 May
Gold	Letitia Sim	Swimming	Women's 200M Breaststroke	10 May
Gold	Mikkel Lee	Swimming	Men's 50M Butterfly	10 May
Gold	Quah Ting Wen	Swimming	Women's 50M Freestyle	10 May
Gold	Ang Chen Xiang	Athletics	Men's 110m hurdles	10 May
Gold	Sheik Farhan	Pencak Silat	Men's tanding class I	10 May
Gold	Quah Zheng Wen; Nicholas Mahabir; Quah Jing Wen; Quah Ting Wen	Swimming	Mixed 4x100M Medley Relay	9 May
Gold	Letitia Sim	Swimming	Women's 100M Breaststroke	9 May
Gold	Quah Zheng Wen	Swimming	Men's 100M Butterfly	9 May
Gold	Quah Jing Wen	Swimming	Women's 100M Butterfly	9 May
Gold	Jonathan Tan; Ardi Azman; Teong Tzen Wei; Quah Zheng Wen	Swimming	Men’s 4x100M Medley Relay	8 May
Gold	Gan Ching Hwee	Swimming	Women's 400M Freestyle	8 May
Gold	Quah Ting Wen	Swimming	Women's 100M Freestyle	8 May
Gold	Shanti Pereira	Athletics	Women's 200M	8 May
Gold	Ellyn Jiamin Tan; Chia Teck Pin	Sailing	Mixed 29er	8 May
Gold	Isaac Goh	Sailing	ILCA 4 Open	8 May
Gold	Ryan Lo	Sailing	Men's ILCA 7	8 May
Gold	Letitia Sim	Swimming	Women's 200M Individual Medley	7 May
Gold	Gan Ching Hwee	Swimming	Women's 200M Freestyle	7 May
Gold	Jonathan Tan	Swimming	Men’s 50M Freestyle	7 May
Gold	Amirah Sahrin; Iffah Batrisyia; Nur Ashikin	Pencak Silat	Women's regu	7 May
Gold (Note: this is Singapore's Overall 1000th SEA Games Gold Medal)	Quah Ting Wen; Quah Jing Wen; Amanda Lim; Nur Marina Chan	Swimming	Women's 4x100M Freestyle Relay	6 May
Gold	Quah Zheng Wen	Swimming	Men’s 100M Backstroke	6 May
Gold	Jonathan Tan	Swimming	Men’s 100M Freestyle	6 May
Gold	Quah Jing Wen	Swimming	Women’s 200M Butterfly	6 May
Gold	Noah Lim	Martial Arts Jujitsu	Men's Ne-Waza Gi 69KG	6 May
Silver	Gary Chow	Wrestling	Men's U79KG	16 May
Silver	Men's team	Hockey	Men's team	16 May
Silver	Samuel Elijah Robson; Max Neo; Zephaniah Kiew; Lionel Wee	Fencing	Men's Foil	16 May
Silver	Women's team	Water Polo	Women's team	16 May
Silver	Danielle Lim	Wrestling	Women's 57KG	15 May
Silver	Dan Wei Zhuo; Lucius Loh; Jorelle See; Nicholas Loo	Fencing	Men's Sabre	15 May
Silver	Aryan Azman	Wrestling	Men's Greco-Roman 82KG	14 May
Silver	Clarence Chew; Zeng Jian	Table Tennis	Mixed doubles	14 May
Silver	Zhou Jingyi; Wong Xin Ru	Table Tennis	Women Doubles	14 May
Silver	Alvin Woo	Xiangqi	Men's Standard	13 May
Silver	Diyanah Aqidah	Taekwondo	Women's Recognized Poomsae	12 May
Silver	Marc Brian Louis	Athletics	Men’s 100M	12 May
Silver	Tay Yu Xuan	Wushu	Men's taijiquan & Taijijian	12 May
Silver	Jowen Lim	Wushu	Men's Changquan	12 May
Silver	Ashley Lim	Swimming	Women's 800M Freestyle	11 May
Silver	Soh Rui Yong	Athletics	Men's 10000M	11 May
Silver	Nicholas Mahabir	Swimming	Men's 50M Breaststroke	11 May
Silver	Quah Ting Wen	Swimming	Women's 50M Butterfly	11 May
Silver	Jessica Ong	Fencing	Women's Sabre	11 May
Silver	Zoe Tan	Wushu	Women's daoshu + Gunshu	11 May
Silver	Aloysius Yapp	Billiards	Men's 9-Ball Pool	10 May
Silver	Nicholas Mahabir	Swimming	Men's 200M Breaststroke	10 May
Silver	Teong Tzen Wei	Swimming	Men's 50M Butterfly	10 May
Silver	Amanda Lim	Swimming	Women's 50M Freestyle	10 May
Silver	Muhammad Nurshahfareeq	Pencak Silat	Men's tanding class H	10 May
Silver	Sheik Ferdous	Pencak Silat	Men's tanding class G	10 May
Silver	Nadrah Sahrin	Pencak Silat	Women's tanding class A	10 May
Silver	Faith Khoo	Swimming	Women's 100M Backstroke	9 May
Silver	Teong Tzen Wei	Swimming	Men's 100M Butterfly	9 May
Silver	Quah Ting Wen	Swimming	Women's 100M Butterfly	9 May
Silver	Peter Gilchrist	Billiards	Men's English Billiards	9 May
Silver	Kaeson Lim	Gymnastics	Pommel Horse	9 May
Silver	Ashley Lim	Swimming	Women's 400M Freestyle	8 May
Silver	Cheryl Yong; Ethan Chia	Sailing	Mixed 29er	8 May
Silver	Ang Jania	Sailing	Women's ILCA 6	8 May
Silver	Jayson Tan	Sailing	Men's windsurfing RS:X	8 May
Silver	Elkan Oh	Sailing	Men's IQFoil	8 May
Silver	Jonathan Tan; Ardi Azman; Glen Lim; Darren Chua	Swimming	Men’s 4x200M Freestyle Relay	7 May
Silver	Nicholas Mahabir	Swimming	Men’s 100M Breaststroke	7 May
Silver	Teong Tzen Wei	Swimming	Men’s 50M Freestyle	7 May
Silver	Tang Yong Siang	Martial Arts Jujitsu	Men's Ne-Waza NOGI 56KG	7 May
Silver	Letitia Sim	Swimming	Women’s 50M Breaststroke	6 May
Silver	Quah Zheng Wen	Swimming	Men’s 100M Freestyle	6 May
Bronze	Lou Hong Yeow	Wrestling	Men's U74KG	16 May
Bronze	Lim Zi Xyan	Wrestling	Men's U65KG	16 May
Bronze	Khairul Fahmi; Muhammad Danish Irfan; Muhammad Ramli; Muhammad Afif; Muhammad Asri	Sepak Takraw	Men's regu	16 May
Bronze	Men's team	Floorball	Men's team	16 May
Bronze	Men's team	Cricket	Men’s T10	16 May
Bronze	Women's team	Hockey	Field Hockey	15 May
Bronze	Jezamine Chua	Wrestling	Women's 76KG	15 May
Bronze	Aaron Ng	Judo	Men's U90KG	15 May
Bronze	Valerie Teo	Judo	Women's U52KG	15 May
Bronze	Nge Joo Jie; Johann Prajogo	Badminton	Men's doubles	15 May
Bronze	Loh Yi Hao; Ng Junyang	Xiangqi	Men's Rapid Team	14 May
Bronze	Timothy Loh Yu	Wrestling	Men's Greco-Roman 130KG	14 May
Bronze	Eddy Zulqarnain	Wrestling	Men's Greco-Roman 60KG	14 May
Bronze	Zhou Yijie	Judo	Men's 66KG	14 May
Bronze	Nur Fadzlyn	Taekwondo	Women’s Under 49KG Kyorugi	14 May
Bronze	Beh Kun Ting; Ethan Poh	Table Tennis	Men's doubles	14 May
Bronze	Simon Lee; Si To Jian Tong; Bron Sheum	Fencing	Men's Epee	14 May
Bronze	Juliet Heng; Jessica Ong; Nicole Wee; Jean Koh	Fencing	Women's Sabre	14 May
Bronze	Ser Lin Qian; Goi Rui Xuan	Table Tennis	Women's doubles	14 May
Bronze	Soh Keng Chuan; Tan Cheng Kiat Benny	Judo	Men's Kime No Kata	13 May
Bronze	Fiona Tan	Xiangqi	Women's Standard	13 May
Bronze	Keston Pang	Taekwondo	Men's under 45KG Kyorugi	13 May
Bronze	Kiria Tikanah	Fencing	Women's Epee	13 May
Bronze	Diyanah Aqidah; Fong Peng Shin	Taekwondo	Mixed Recognized Poomsae Pair	12 May
Bronze	Aloysius Yeo; Fong Peng Shin; Nicholas Adam Khaw	Taekwondo	Men's Recognized Poomsae Team	12 May
Bronze	Cheung Kemei	Fencing	Women's Foil	12 May
Bronze	Dan Wei Zuo	Fencing	Men's Sabre	12 May
Bronze	Calvin Quek	Athletics	Men's 400m hurdles	11 May
Bronze	Glen Lim	Swimming	Men's 400M Freestyle	11 May
Bronze	Goh Chui Ling	Athletics	Women's 800M	11 May
Bronze	Simon Lee Renjie	Fencing	Men's Epee	11 May
Bronze	Max Lee	Diving	Men's 10M Platform	11 May
Bronze	Men's team	Cricket	Men's T20	11 May
Bronze	Velvan Tan	Boxing	Men's 67KG	10 May
Bronze	Muhammad Danish	Boxing	Men's 80KG	10 May
Bronze	Joshua Chua; Marc Brian Louis; Mark Lee Ren; Xander Ho	Athletics	Men's 4x100m Relay	10 May
Bronze	Zhou Jingyi; Zeng Jian; Wong Xin Ru; Goi Rui Xuan; Ser Lin Qian	Table Tennis	Women's team	10 May
Bronze	Maximillian Ang	Swimming	Men's 200M Breaststroke	10 May
Bronze	Christie Chue	Swimming	Women's 200M Breaststroke	10 May
Bronze	Kimberly Ong; Zoe Tan; Zeanne Law	Wushu	Women's duilian	10 May
Bronze	Terry Hee; Joel Koh; Andy Kwek; Loh Kean Hean; Loh Kean Yew; Nge Joo Jie; Johann Prajogo; Jason Teh Jia Heng; Marcus Lau; Donovan Willard Wee	Badminton	Men's team	10 May
Bronze	Yeo Jia Min; Jin Yujia; Crystal Wong; Insyirah Khan; Heng Xiao En; Elsa Lai; Megan Lee; Jessica Tan; Grace Chua	Badminton	Women's team	10 May
Bronze	Dhani Andika	Pencak Silat	Men's Tanding Below 45KG	10 May
Bronze	Nur Sabrina	Boxing	Women's 63KG	9 May
Bronze	Christie Chue	Swimming	Women's 100M Breaststroke	9 May
Bronze	Goh Chui Ling	Athletics	Women's 1500M	9 May
Bronze	Michelle Sng	Athletics	Women's high jump	9 May
Bronze	Nur Tuhfah Izzah	Pencak Silat	Women's Tanding Below 45KG	9 May
Bronze	Nurul Suhaila	Pencak Silat	Women's tanding class E	9 May
Bronze	Avvir Tham	Diving	Men's 3M Springboard	9 May
Bronze	Glen Lim	Swimming	Men's 1500M Freestyle	8 May
Bronze	Louisa Marie Middleditch	Triathlon	Women’s Individual	8 May
Bronze	Mixed Team	ESports	League of Legends Wild Rift (Mobile) Team	7 May
Bronze	Quah Jing Wen	Swimming	Women's 200M Individual Medley	7 May
Bronze	Maximillian Ang	Swimming	Men’s 100M Breaststroke	7 May
Bronze	Chan Zi Yi	Swimming	Women's 200M Freestyle	7 May
Bronze	Quah Zheng Wen	Swimming	Men’s 50M Backstroke	7 May
Bronze	Noah Lim	Martial Arts Jujitsu	Men's Ne-Waza NOGI 69KG	7 May
Bronze	Iqbal Abdul Rahman	Pencak Silat	Men’s Tunggal	7 May
Bronze	Siti Nazurah	Pencak Silat	Women's tunggal	7 May
Bronze	Zachary Ian Tan	Swimming	Men’s 200M Individual Medley	6 May
Bronze	Amirul Syafiq	Martial Arts Jujitsu	Men's Ne-Waza Gi 62KG	6 May
Bronze	Chen Aik Yu; Loogeswaran; Syed Ali; Jumaeen Amat Kamsin; Arasu Ct Karuppiah; Muhammad Mat Rahim; Hanif Murid; Guhan Mayazhagu; Yang Goh Kai; Muhammad Syafiq; Abdul Rashid Muhammad Shafiq; Gerald Wong	Indoor Hockey	Men's team	6 May
Bronze	Bryce Chong	Aquathlon	Men's individual	6 May
All sporting and medalist records are kept by SNOC

== Athletics ==
Men

Track and road events

Athlete	Event	Heat		Final	
Athlete	Event	Time	Rank	Time	Rank
Marc Brian Louis	100m	10.52	3 Q	10.39	2nd place, silver medalist(s)
Joshua Hanwei Chua	100m	10.93	2 Q	10.78	6
Soh Rui Yong	10,000 metre	—N/a		31:10.70 NR	2nd place, silver medalist(s)

Women
Track and road events

At the women's 200m race, Shanti Pereira defended her title and broke both SEA Games' record of 23.01s, formerly held by Philippines’ Kristina Knott in 2019 and Singapore's national record of 22.89s, set by herself with a time of 22.69s.

Goh Chui Ling rewrote her national mark for the 1,500m when she came in third with a time of 4:26.33.

Athlete	Event	Heat		Final	
Athlete	Event	Time	Rank	Time	Rank
Shanti Pereira	100m				1st place, gold medalist(s)
Elizabethann Tan	100m				6th
Shanti Pereira	200m	24.030	1 Q	22.69 NR GR	1st place, gold medalist(s)
Elizabethann Tan	200m	24.120	3 Q	24.030 PB	5th
Goh Chui Ling	1500m	—N/a		4:26.33 NR	3rd place, bronze medalist(s)

== Badminton ==
Men

Athlete	Event	Round of 32	Round of 16	Quarterfinal	Semifinal	Final
Athlete	Event	Opposition Score	Opposition Score	Opposition Score	Opposition Score	Rank
Marcus Lau	Singles	Zidane Evaldo Costa Gusmao de Jesus (TLS); W (21–2, 21–8)	Panitchaphon Teeraratsakul (THA); L (21–9, 21–12)	Did not advance		
Joel Koh	Singles	Bye	Leong Jun Hao (MAS); L (23-21, 21-14)	Did not advance		
Nge Joo Jie; Johann Prajogo	Doubles	—N/a	Heng Mengleap/Yam Samnang (CAM); W (21–10, 21–11)	Chia Wei Jie/ Liew Xun (MAS); W (21-19, 21-18)	Pramudya Kusumawardana/Yeremia Rambitan (INA); L (16-21,18-21)	3rd place, bronze medalist(s)
Terry Hee; Joel Koh; Andy Kwek; Loh Kean Hean; Loh Kean Yew; Nge Joo Jie; Johann Prajogo; Jason Teh Jia Heng; Marcus Lau; Donovan Willard Wee	Team	—N/a		Philippines (PHI); W 3–1	Indonesia (INA); L 3-1	3rd place, bronze medalist(s)

Women

Player	Event	Round of 32	Round of 16	Quarter-finals	Semi-finals	Final
Player	Event	Opponent Score	Opponent Score	Opponent Score	Opponent Score	Rank
Megan Lee	Singles	—N/a	Zoraida Dela Torre Costa Gusmao de Jesus (TLS); W (21–3, 21–7)	Komang Ayu Cahya Dewi (INA); L (21–10, 21–9)	Did not advance	
Insyirah Khan	Singles	—N/a	Heang Leakhena (CAM); W (21-5, 21-1)	Supanida Katethong (THA); L (21-13, 21-17)	Did not advance	
Heng Xiao En; Elsa Lai	Doubles	—N/a	Chheng Huy/Seavty Teav (CAM); W (21-17, 21-19, 21-8)	Cheng Su Hui/Cheng Su Yin (MAS); L (21-12, 21- 11)	Did not advance	
Heng Xiao En; Khan Insyirah; Jin Yujia; Elsa Lai; Megan Lee; Crystal Wong; Yeo Jia Min; Grace Chua; Jessica Tan	Team	—N/a		Vietnam (VIE); W 3–0	Thailand (THA); L 1–3	3rd place, bronze medalist(s)

Mixed

Athlete	Event	Round of 32	Round of 16	Quarterfinal	Semifinal	Final
Athlete	Event	Opposition Score	Opposition Score	Opposition Score	Opposition Score	Rank
Johann Prajogo; Elsa Lai	Doubles	—N/a	Solomon Padiz Jr. / Eleanor Inlayo (PHI); L (21-12, 21-8)	Did not advance		
Donovan Willard Wee; Heng Xiao En	Doubles	—N/a	Yap Roy King/Cheng Su Yin (MAS); L (21-14, 21-17)	Did not advance		

== Basketball ==
Men

Team	Event	Round-robin			
Team	Event	Opposition Score	Opposition Score	Opposition Score	Rank
Singapore	3X3 Basketball	Malaysia; L 21-15	Cambodia; L 21-13	Thailand; L 22-12	3rd place, bronze medalist(s)

Team	Event	Round-robin				7th place	Final
Team	Event	Opposition Score	Opposition Score	Opposition Score	Rank	Opposition Score	Rank
Singapore	5X5 Basketball	Cambodia; L 85-60	Malaysia; L 70-93	Philippines; L 45-105	4	Laos; W 84-49	7

Women

Team	Event	Round-robin			
Team	Event	Opposition Score	Opposition Score	Opposition Score	Rank
Singapore	3X3 Basketball	Indonesia; L 21-11	Cambodia; L 21-12	Malaysia; L 21-7	3rd

Team	Event	Round-robin						
Team	Event	Opposition Score	Opposition Score	Opposition Score	Opposition Score	Opposition Score	Opposition Score	Rank
Singapore	5X5 Basketball	Thailand; L 78-26	Malaysia; L 75-39	Philippines	Cambodia	Indonesia	Vietnam	

== Cricket ==
Men

Team	Event	Group Stage				Final / BM	
Team	Event	Opposition Score	Opposition Score	Opposition Score	Rank	Opposition Score	Rank
Men's	T6s	Indonesia (INA) W 85/4-71/4	Philippines (PHI) L 84/2-80/5	Cambodia (CAM) W 97-71	1st	-	1st place, gold medalist(s)
Men's	T10	Malaysia (MAS); W 107-98	Thailand (THA); L 87-86	-	2	Philippines (PHI); W 93-92	3rd place, bronze medalist(s)
Men's	T20	Cambodia; L 181/7-166/10	Philippines; W 181/5-94/9	-	2	Indonesia; W 162-147	3rd place, bronze medalist(s)

Women

Team	Event	Group Stage				Final / BM	
Team	Event	Opposition Score	Opposition Score	Opposition Score	Rank	Opposition Score	Rank
Women's	T10	Malaysia (MAS); L 37/3 (10 overs) – 38/1 (4.1 overs)	Thailand (THA) L 19/1-18/5	-	3rd	-	-
Women's	T20	Cambodia; W 132-68	Indonesia; L 121-69	-	2nd	Malaysia; L 54-51	4th

== Fencing ==
Athlete	Event	Preliminaries Pool		Round of 16	Quarterfinals	Semifinals	Finals	
Athlete	Event	Opposition Score	Seed	Opposition Score	Opposition Score	Opposition Score	Opposition Score	Rank
Samuel Elijah Robson	Individual Foil	M Kimleng (CAM); W 5–0	4Q	Bye	S Doungpatra (THA); W 15–7	Cheng Xing Han (MAS); W 15–6	S L Tranquilan (PHI); W 15–3	1st place, gold medalist(s)
Samuel Elijah Robson	Individual Foil	Cheng Xing Han (MAS); L 1–5	4Q	Bye	S Doungpatra (THA); W 15–7	Cheng Xing Han (MAS); W 15–6	S L Tranquilan (PHI); W 15–3	1st place, gold medalist(s)
Samuel Elijah Robson	Individual Foil	N M Perez (PHI); W 5–2	4Q	Bye	S Doungpatra (THA); W 15–7	Cheng Xing Han (MAS); W 15–6	S L Tranquilan (PHI); W 15–3	1st place, gold medalist(s)
Samuel Elijah Robson	Individual Foil	S Doungpatra (THA); L 4–5	4Q	Bye	S Doungpatra (THA); W 15–7	Cheng Xing Han (MAS); W 15–6	S L Tranquilan (PHI); W 15–3	1st place, gold medalist(s)
Samuel Elijah Robson	Individual Foil	N Văn Hải (VIE); W 5–4	4Q	Bye	S Doungpatra (THA); W 15–7	Cheng Xing Han (MAS); W 15–6	S L Tranquilan (PHI); W 15–3	1st place, gold medalist(s)
Max Neo	Individual Foil	K Tima (CAM); W 5–1	3Q	R Deejing (THA); W 15–11	Did not advance			
Max Neo	Individual Foil	Hans Wei Shen Yoong (MAS); L 2–5	3Q	R Deejing (THA); W 15–11	Did not advance			
Max Neo	Individual Foil	S L Tranquilan (PHI); W 5–4	3Q	R Deejing (THA); W 15–11	Did not advance			
Max Neo	Individual Foil	R Deejing (THA); W 5–3	3Q	R Deejing (THA); W 15–11	Did not advance			
Max Neo	Individual Foil	N Minh Quang (VIE); W 5–2	3Q	R Deejing (THA); W 15–11	Did not advance			

== Floorball ==
Men

Team	Event	Round-robin					Final/BM	
Team	Event	Opposition Score	Opposition Score	Opposition Score	Opposition Score	Rank	Opposition Score	Rank
Singapore	Men's team	Cambodia; W 12–1	Malaysia; W 6–0	Philippines; L 1–2	Thailand; L 4-3	3rd	Malaysia; W 3-1	3rd place, bronze medalist(s)

Women

Team	Event	Round-robin					Final/BM	
Team	Event	Opposition Score	Opposition Score	Opposition Score	Opposition Score	Rank	Opposition Score	Rank
Singapore	Women's team	Cambodia; W 16–0	Malaysia; W 13–0	Philippines; W 5-0	Thailand; L 3-1	2nd	Thailand; W 4-2	1st place, gold medalist(s)

== Football ==
Summary

Key:

- A.E.T – After extra time.
- P – Match decided by penalty-shootout.

Team	Event	Group Stage					Semifinal	Final / BM	
Team	Event	Opposition Score	Opposition Score	Opposition Score	Opposition Score	Rank	Opposition Score	Opposition Score	Rank
Singapore	Men's tournament	Thailand; L 3-1	Vietnam; L 3-1	Laos; D 0-0	Malaysia; L 7-0	5	Did not advance		

Team	Event	Group Stage				Semifinal	Final / BM	
Team	Event	Opposition Score	Opposition Score	Opposition Score	Rank	Opposition Score	Opposition Score	Rank
Singapore	Women's tournament	Thailand; L 4-0	Cambodia; L 1-0	Laos; W 2-1	3	Did not advance		

== Hockey ==
Indoor Hockey

Team	Event	Group Stage						Final / BM	
Team	Event	Opposition Score	Opposition Score	Opposition Score	Opposition Score	Opposition Score	Rank	Opposition Score	Rank
Singapore	Men's tournament	Indonesia; L 7-0	Cambodia; W 4-1	Malaysia; L 5-0	Philippines; W 11-0	Thailand; L 4-1	4	—N/a	= (bronze)
Singapore	Women's tournament	Malaysia; L 8-0	Indonesia; L 4-0	Cambodia; L 1-0	Philippines; W 3-1	Thailand; D 2-2	5	Did not advance	

Field Hockey

Team	Event	Group Stage					Final / BM	
Team	Event	Opposition Score	Opposition Score	Opposition Score	Opposition Score	Rank	Opposition Score	Rank
Singapore	Men's tournament	Indonesia; D 2-2	Malaysia; L 4-3	Cambodia; W 4-1	Thailand; W 6-1	2nd	Malaysia; L 3-0	2nd place, silver medalist(s)
Singapore	Women's tournament	Indonesia; D 2-2	Malaysia; L 4-1	Cambodia; D 2-2	Thailand; W 1-0	3rd	-	3rd place, bronze medalist(s)

== Pencak silat ==
seni

Athlete	Event	Elimination Rounds	Semifinal	Final	
Athlete	Event	Opposition Score	Opposition Score	Opposition Score	Rank
Muhammad Iqbal bin Abdul Rahman	Men's tunggal		Soem Sokdevid (CAM); L 9.935–9.955	Did not advance	3rd place, bronze medalist(s)
Siti Nazurah	Women's tunggal		Puspa Arum Sari (INA); L 9.935–9.955	Did not advance	3rd place, bronze medalist(s)

== Sailing ==
Team	Event	Race																TP	NP	Rank
Team	Event	1	2	3	4	5	6	7	8	9	10	11	12	13	14	15	MR	TP	NP	Rank
Ryan Lo Jun Han	Men's ILCA 7	1	1	(~~2~~)	1	1	1	1	1	1	1	—N/a	—N/a	—N/a	—N/a	—N/a	2	13	11	1st place, gold medalist(s)
Elkan Reshawn Oh	Men's IQFoil	(~~3~~)	2	2	3	(~~4~~)	2	3	3	1	3	2	2	2	1	2	4	39	32	2nd place, silver medalist(s)
David Ng Tiong Gee	Men's windsurfing RS:One	3	4	5	5	4	4	3	2	3	5	(~~6~~) ~~DNF~~	5	—N/a	—N/a	—N/a	8	57	51	5
Jayson Jian Sen Tan	Men's windsurfing RS:X	2	2	1	2	2	(~~3~~)	2	3	1	2	2	3	—N/a	—N/a	—N/a	4	29	26	2nd place, silver medalist(s)
Jania Ang	Women's ILCA 6	2	1	1	(~~3~~)	2	3	2	2	2	1	—N/a	—N/a	—N/a	—N/a	—N/a	4	22	19	2nd place, silver medalist(s)
Isaac Goh	ILCA 4	1	1	1	1	1	1	(~~2~~)	2	1	1	—N/a	—N/a	—N/a	—N/a	—N/a	—N/a	16	14	1st place, gold medalist(s)
Ellyn Jiamin Tan; Teck Pin Chia	29er	3	2	2	(~~6~~) DSQ	2	1	2	1	3	1	2	2	—N/a	—N/a	—N/a	—N/a	29	23	1st place, gold medalist(s)
Cheryl Heng Xi Yong; Ethan Han Wei Chia	Mixed Optimist	(~~7~~) 2	6 (~~3~~)	6 3	5 1	3 1	4 2	4 1	6 1	5 1	10 2	—N/a	—N/a	—N/a	—N/a	—N/a	—N/a	81; 63; 18	71; 56; 15	2nd place, silver medalist(s)

== Table Tennis ==
Men

Athlete	Event	Group Stage				Round of 16	Quarterfinals	Semifinals	Final	
Athlete	Event	Opposition Score	Opposition Score	Opposition Score	Rank	Opposition Score	Opposition Score	Opposition Score	Opposition Score	Rank
Izaac Quek	Singles	Y Kang (CAM); L 2–3	R Gonzales (PHI); W 3–0	A T Nguyễn (VIE); W 3–1	Q 1	—N/a	Wong (MAS); W 3–2	C F Leong (MAS); W 4–1	A T Nguyễn (VIE); W 4–0	1st place, gold medalist(s)
Clarence Chew	Singles	RN Niman (INA); W 3–1	Phinith Kongphet (LAO); W 3–1	P Tanviriyavechakul (THA); L 1–3	Q 3	—N/a	C F Leong (MAS); L 2–4	Did not advance		
Koen Pang; Izaac Quek	Doubles	—N/a				AH Dinh (VIE) / DD Le (VIE); W 3–0	S Tancharoen (THA) / S Nuchchart (THA); W 3–1	R Gonzales (PHI) / JR Misal (PHI); W 3–1	QS Wong (MAS) / J Choon (MAS); W 3–1	1st place, gold medalist(s)
Beh Kun Ting; Ethan Poh	Doubles	—N/a				Y Kang (CAM) / T Yin (CAM); W 3–0	N Thanmathikom (THA) / P Sanguansin (THA); W 3–1	QS Wong (MAS) / J Choon (MAS); L 1–3	Did not advance	3rd place, bronze medalist(s)
Koen Pang; Clarence Chew; Izaac Quek	Team	Laos (LAO); W 3-0	Philippines (PHI); W 3-0	Malaysia (MAS); W 3-0	Q 1	—N/a	—N/a	Thailand (THA); W 3-0	Malaysia (MAS); W 3-0	1st place, gold medalist(s)

Women

Athlete	Event	Group Stage				Round of 16	Quarterfinals	Semifinals	Final	
Athlete	Event	Opposition Score	Opposition Score	Opposition Score	Rank	Opposition Score	Opposition Score	Opposition Score	Opposition Score	Rank
Zeng Jian	Singles	C M Annika (CAM); W 3–0	LS Chang (MAS); W 3–0	B Ngọc Lan (VIE); W 3–0	Q 1	—N/a	K R Cruz (PHI); W 4–1	O Paranang (THA); W 4–1	S Sawettabut (THA); W 4–3	1st place, gold medalist(s)
Zhou Jingyi	Singles	N Widarahman (INA); W 3–0	Y Ho (MAS); W 3–0	E R P Dael (PHI); W 3–0	Q 3	—N/a	O Paranang (THA); L 3–4	Did not advance		
Ser Lin Qian; Goi Rui Xuan	Doubles	—N/a				Bye	K L Dick / A X Tee (MAS); W 3–0	O Paranang / S Sawettabut (THA); L 0–3	Did not advance	3rd place, bronze medalist(s)
Zhou Jingyi; Wong Xin Ru	Doubles	—N/a				Bye	J Sawettabut / T Khetkhuan (THA); W 3–0	L S Chang / L Y Im (MAS); W 3–0	O Paranang / S Sawettabut (THA); L 0–3	2nd place, silver medalist(s)
Zhou Jingyi; Zeng Jian; Wong Xin Ru; Goi Rui Xuan; Ser Lin Qian	Team	Cambodia (CAM); W 3-0	Malaysia (MAS); L 0-3	—N/a	Q 2	—N/a		Thailand (THA); L 0-3	Did not advance	3rd place, bronze medalist(s)

== Volleyball ==
Indoor

Team	Event	Round-robin			5th-8th Placing		
Team	Event	Opposition Score	Opposition Score	Opposition Score	Opposition Score	Opposition Score	Rank
Singapore	Men's team	Cambodia; L 3-0	Indonesia; L 3-0	Philippines; W 3-0	Myanmar; W 3-0	Philippines; L 3-1	6th

Team	Event	Round-robin			5th-8th Placing		
Team	Event	Opposition Score	Opposition Score	Opposition Score	Opposition Score	Opposition Score	Rank
Singapore	Women's team	Vietnam; L 3-0	Cambodia; W 3-0	Philippines; L 3-0	Myanmar; W 3-2	Malaysia; W 3-2	5th

== Water Polo ==
Men

Team	Event	Round-robin					
Team	Event	Opposition Score	Opposition Score	Opposition Score	Opposition Score	Opposition Score	Rank
Singapore	Men's team	Thailand; W 12-7	Malaysia; W 14-1	Indonesia; W 12-5	Philippines; W 10-4	Cambodia; W 22-14	1st place, gold medalist(s)

Women

Team	Event	Round-robin		
Team	Event	Opposition Score	Opposition Score	Rank
Singapore	Women's team	Thailand; L 11-4	Indonesia; W 10-6	2nd place, silver medalist(s)
