= Table tennis at the 2025 SEA Games – Mixed doubles =

Table tennis – Mixed doubles at the 2025 SEA Games
- Venue: Westgate Hall, Central Westgate
- Dates: 16–17 December 2025
- Competitors: 26 from 7 nations

Medalists
gold medal	Koen Pang Yew En; Zeng Jian	Singapore
silver medal	Javen Choong; Karen Lyne Dick	Malaysia
bronze medal	Wong Qi Shen; Tee Ai Xin	Malaysia
bronze medal	Nawin Nekamporn; Jinnipa Sawettabut	Thailand

The mixed doubles competition of the table tennis event at the 2025 SEA Games was held from 16 to 17 December at the Westgate Hall, Central Westgate in Nonthaburi, Thailand.

== Participating nations ==
A total of 26 athletes from seven nations competed in mixed doubles table tennis at the 2025 Southeast Asian Games:

- Indonesia (4)
- Malaysia (4)
- Myanmar (2)
- Philippines (4)
- Singapore (4)
- Thailand (4)
- Vietnam (4)

== Schedule ==
All times are Thailand Time (UTC+07:00).

Date	Time	Round
Saturday, 16 December 2025	20:00	Round of 16
Saturday, 16 December 2025	11:40	Quarterfinals
Sunday, 17 December 2025	10:00	Semifinals
Sunday, 17 December 2025	18:00	Final

== Results ==
Round of 16; 16 December 10:00
(Vietnam) Đinh AH (Vietnam) Trần MN
Bye
(Philippines) ED Tormis (Philippines) AJ Laude	10	11	10	7	1
(Malaysia) J Choong (Malaysia) KL Dick	12	9	12	11	3
(Thailand) N Nekamporn (Thailand) J Sawettabut	12	11	11	6	15	2
(Indonesia) AM Pratama (Indonesia) R Sintya	14	6	5	11	17	3
Bye
(Singapore) Pang YEK (Singapore) Zeng J
(Malaysia) Wong QS (Malaysia) Tee AX	11	11	11	3
(Myanmar) K Min Ko (Myanmar) NN Win	1	5	3	0
(Vietnam) Nguyễn AT (Vietnam) Nguyễn KDK	11	11	11	3
(Philippines) JM Nayre (Philippines) KR Cruz	8	5	6	0
(Singapore) Chew ZYC (Singapore) Loy MY	11	11	11	3
(Indonesia) NJ Muhammad (Indonesia) A Nebuchadnezzar	7	7	8	0
Bye
(Thailand) S Tancharoen (Thailand) W Aueawiriyayothin

Quarterfinal; 16 December 11:40
(Vietnam) Đinh AH (Vietnam) Trần MN	6	12	12	11	8	2
(Malaysia) J Choong (Malaysia) KL Dick	11	10	14	2	11	3
(Indonesia) AM Pratama (Indonesia) R Sintya	11	10	9	11	3	2
(Singapore) Pang YEK (Singapore) Zeng J	7	12	11	7	11	3
(Malaysia) Wong QS (Malaysia) Tee AX	9	8	11	11	11	3
(Vietnam) Nguyễn AT (Vietnam) Nguyễn KDK	11	11	8	3	9	2
(Singapore) Chew ZYC (Singapore) Loy MY	4	11	11	4	9	2
(Thailand) S Tancharoen (Thailand) W Aueawiriyayothin	11	5	7	11	11	3

Semifinal; 17 December 10:00
(Malaysia) J Choong (Malaysia) KL Dick	9	5	4	0
(Singapore) Pang YEK (Singapore) Zeng J	11	11	11	3
(Malaysia) Wong QS (Malaysia) Tee AX	6	11	11	11	6	3
(Thailand) S Tancharoen (Thailand) W Aueawiriyayothin	11	5	6	7	1

Final; 17 December 18:00
(Singapore) Pang YEK (Singapore) Zeng J	11	11	11	3
(Malaysia) Wong QS (Malaysia) Tee AX	6	7	2	0
