= Water polo at the 2023 SEA Games =

- Venue: Olympic Swimming Pool, Olympic Sports Complex
- Location: Khan Boeng Keng Kang, Phnom Penh, Cambodia
- Date: 12–16 May 2023

Medalists
gold medal	Singapore men
gold medal	Thailand women

The water polo competitions at the 2023 SEA Games were held at the Olympic Swimming Pool of Olympic Sports Complex in Phnom Penh, Cambodia.

The previous water polo tournament was in 2019 because it was not an event during the 2021 SEA Games.

== Participating nations ==
Nation	Men	Women
Cambodia	Yes	No
Indonesia	Yes	Yes
Malaysia	Yes	No
Philippines	Yes	No
Singapore	Yes	Yes
Thailand	Yes	Yes

== Competition ==
Date	Day	Teams	Winner	Event	
12 May	Friday	Thailand vs Singapore	Thailand	Round Robin	Women's
12 May	Friday	Indonesia vs Cambodia	Indonesia	Round Robin	Men's
12 May	Friday	Thailand vs Singapore	Singapore	Round Robin	Men's
12 May	Friday	Philippines vs Malaysia	Philippines	Round Robin	Men's
13 May	Saturday	Cambodia vs Thailand	Thailand	Round Robin	Men's
13 May	Saturday	Malaysia vs Singapore	Singapore	Round Robin	Men's
13 May	Saturday	Indonesia vs Philippines	Indonesia	Round Robin	Men's
14 May	Sunday	Singapore vs Indonesia	Singapore	Round Robin	Women's
14 May	Sunday	Thailand vs Malaysia	Thailand	Round Robin	Men's
14 May	Sunday	Singapore vs. Indonesia	Singapore	Round Robin	Men's
14 May	Sunday	Philippines vs Cambodia	Philippines	Round Robin	Men's
15 May	Monday	Cambodia vs Malaysia	Malaysia	Round Robin	Men's
15 May	Monday	Indonesia vs Thailand	Thailand	Round Robin	Men's
15 May	Monday	Philippines vs Singapore	Singapore	Round Robin	Men's
16 May	Tuesday	Indonesia vs Thailand	Thailand	Round Robin	Women's
16 May	Tuesday	Cambodia vs Singapore	Singapore	Round Robin	Men's
16 May	Tuesday	Thailand vs Malaysia	Thailand	Round Robin	Men's
16 May	Tuesday	Philippines vs Thailand	Thailand	Round Robin	Men's

=== Group stage ===
Men

Team	Match	Win	Loss	Draw	Win pt.	Lose pt.	Diff. pt.
Cambodia	3	0	3	0	8	91	-83
Indonesia	3	2	1	0	54	20	34
Thailand	3	2	1	0	60	18	42
Philippines	3	2	1	0	41	20	21
Singapore	3	3	0	0	38	13	25
Malaysia	3	0	3	0	9	48	-39

Women

Team	Match	Win	Loss	Draw	Win pt.	Lose pt.	Diff. pt.
Singapore	2	1	1	0	14	17	-3
Thailand	1	1	0	0	11	4	7
Indonesia	1	0	1	0	6	10	-4

== Medalists ==
Event	Gold	Silver	Bronze
Men	Singapore; Ang An Jun; Chiam Kunyang; Chow Jing Lun; Koh Jian Ying; Lee Cheng-kang; Darren Lee Jit-an; Lee Kai Yang; Cayden Loh Dejun; Loh Zhi Zhi; Paul Louis Tan Jwee Ann; Eugene Teo Zhen Wei; Yang Yip; Yu Junjie	Indonesia; Ahmad Fauzy Mappatabe; Beby Willy Eka Paksi Tarigan; Brandley Ignatius Legawa; Fakhry Mahmud; Gilang Nabhil Saputra; Hizkia Bimantoro; Novian Dwiputra; Rezza Auditya Putra; Rian Rinaldo; Richley Gregorius Legawa; Ridjkie Mulia; Yusuf Budiman; Zaenal Arifin	Thailand; Peerawat Chairit; Pattanit Chompoosang; Watcharawarong Ekchaona; Chanoknan Kaewmanee; Suteenan Kaewmanee; Pruetthikorn Khunprathum; Phatsakorn Maneejohn; Pokpong Morksang; Jakkrit Nakniyom; Kreerati Pimpapak; Kasitha Sangthanapanich; Phuriphong Sangthanapanich; Nopavich Savetmalanond
Women	Thailand; Phanthila Arsayuth; Benyakorn Khunprathum; Thanidakarn Kwantongtanaree; Pranisa Nilklad; Wataniya Nilklad; Kornkarn Puengpongsakul; Panita Pukkaman; Panchita Rodwattanadisakul; Poonnada Rotchanarut; Raksina Rueangsappaisan; Issaree Turon; Yanisa Turon; Satakamol Wongpairoj	Singapore; Melissa Chan Pei Tung; Chow Yan Teng; Koh Ting Ting; Gina Koh Ting Yi; Koh Xiao Li; Heather Lee Xuan Hui; Mounisha Devi Manivannan; Ong Cheng Jing; Rochelle Ong Xuan Rong; Michelle Tan Ting Yee; Nadyn Kei Thinagaran; Ranice Yap Jingxuan; Abielle Yeo Zhi Min	Indonesia; Aenah Aeliyah Purbaningrum; Amazia Keiko Radisty; Desthia Ramadhina Putri; Febrika Indirawati; Febrina Indriasari; Glindra Patricia Legawa; Indah Safitri; Jeanette Ayu Puspita; Melyn Cecilia Legawa; Nazwa Nur Abellia; Nyoman Ayu Savitri Arsana; Selfia Nur Fitroch; Thytania Rhamadini Putri

== Medal table ==
* Host nation (Cambodia)

Rank	Nation	Gold	Silver	Bronze	Total
1	Singapore	1	1	0	2
2	Thailand	1	0	1	2
3	Indonesia	0	1	1	2
Totals (3 entries)		2	2	2	6
