= 2023 SEA Games =

Multi-sport event in Cambodia

XXXII Southeast Asian Games
- Host city: Phnom Penh, Cambodia
- Motto: Sports Live In Peace (Khmer: កីឡារស់ក្នុងសន្តិភាព, UNGEGN: Keila Rós Knŏng Sântĕphéap)
- Nations: 11
- Athletes: 6,210
- Events: 584 in 37 sports
- Opening: 5 May 2023
- Closing: 17 May 2023
- Opened by: Hun Sen; Prime Minister of Cambodia
- Closed by: Hun Sen; Prime Minister of Cambodia
- Athlete's Oath: Montross Phansovannarun
- Torch lighter: Sorn Seavmey
- Main venue: Morodok Techo National Stadium
- Website: cambodia2023.com

The 2023 Southeast Asian Games (Khmer: ការប្រកួតកីឡាប្រជាជាតិអាស៊ីអាគ្នេយ៍២០២៣, UNGEGN: Kar Brâkuŏt Keila Brâchéachéatĕ Asi Aknéy 2023), also known as the 32nd Southeast Asian Games, or the 32nd SEA Games, and commonly known as Cambodia 2023, were the 32nd edition of the Southeast Asian Games, a biennial sports multi-sport event which was held from 5 to 17 May 2023 in Phnom Penh, Cambodia.

The event returned to its 2-year cycle, after the 2021 SEA Games in Vietnam was delayed to 2022 due to the COVID-19 pandemic. The announcement was made at the Southeast Asian Games Federation Council meeting in Singapore, in conjunction with the 2015 SEA Games, by the President of the National Olympic Committee of Cambodia, Thong Khon. The Philippines was originally scheduled to host the games, but was pushed forward to 2019 after Brunei withdrew to host the event. This was the first time that Cambodia hosted the games, as the 1963 Southeast Asian Peninsular Games was cancelled due to the political situation in the country at the time. The event was planned to feature 40 sports. The final number was 37 sports.

== Host selection ==
In 2015, Cambodia was chosen to host the SEA Games 32. The sporting event took place from May 5 to 17, 2023 in the capital city of Phnom Penh and the provinces of Siem Reap, Preah Sihanouk, Kampot, and Kep. Initially, the Philippines was scheduled to host the SEA Games 32. However, after Brunei declined to host due to a lack of competition venues, infrastructure, and preparation time, the Philippines switched to hosting the SEA Games 30 in 2019.

In 2013, the National Olympic Committee of Cambodia (NOCC) announced in a statement that the country's government had agreed in principle to allow the NOCC to bid to host the SEA Games in 2023. According to the plan, Cambodia will build a new Olympic stadium with a total cost of about 150 million USD, in the northeast of the capital Phnom Penh, for the 2023 SEA Games competitions and other international sporting events.

== Development and preparation ==
=== Venues ===
Following the host selection announcement, Prime Minister Hun Sen approved the final design of the Games' main stadium. During a state visit by Hun Sen to Beijing in May 2014, Chinese leader Xi Jinping promised to fund the construction of the main stadium of the new multi-purpose sports complex on the satellite city of Phnom Penh in Khan Chroy Changvar. The 60,000-seat main stadium, which was estimated to cost about US$157 million and was built by a Chinese construction firm, was completed between 2019 and 2020 with a Chinese grant covering the entire project. A multipurpose arena, the Morodok Techo National Sports Complex housed an Olympic swimming pool, an outdoor football pitch, a running track, tennis courts and dormitories for athletes.

City	Venue		Event
Phnom Penh	Morodok Techo Sports Complex	Morodok Techo National Stadium	Opening and closing ceremonies
Phnom Penh	Morodok Techo Sports Complex	Morodok Techo National Stadium	Athletics
Phnom Penh	Morodok Techo Sports Complex	Aquatics Center	Swimming, Diving, Finswimming
Phnom Penh	Morodok Techo Sports Complex	Badminton Hall	Badminton
Phnom Penh	Morodok Techo Sports Complex	Table tennis Hall	Table tennis
Phnom Penh	Morodok Techo Sports Complex	Hockey Stadium	Field hockey
Phnom Penh	Morodok Techo Sports Complex	Elephant Hall 1	Kickboxing, Kun Khmer
Phnom Penh	Morodok Techo Sports Complex	Elephant Hall 2	Basketball
Phnom Penh	Morodok Techo Sports Complex	Basketball Hall	Sepak takraw
Phnom Penh	Morodok Techo Sports Complex	Tennis Sports Center	Soft tennis, Tennis
Phnom Penh	Chroy Changvar Convention Centre	Dinosaur Park Hall	Dancesport, Indoor hockey, Floorball
Phnom Penh	Chroy Changvar Convention Centre	Hall A	Arnis, Karate, Wushu
Phnom Penh	Chroy Changvar Convention Centre	Hall B	Fencing, Jujitsu
Phnom Penh	Chroy Changvar Convention Centre	Hall C	Judo, Kun bokator
Phnom Penh	Chroy Changvar Convention Centre	Hall E	Pencak silat, Wrestling
Phnom Penh	Chroy Changvar Convention Centre	Hall F	Taekwondo, Weightlifting, Vovinam
Phnom Penh	Chroy Changvar Convention Centre	Hall G	Boxing
Phnom Penh	Chroy Changvar Convention Centre	Car Park	Obstacle race
Phnom Penh	Olympic Sports Complex	Olympic Stadium	Football
Phnom Penh	Olympic Sports Complex	Olympic Indoor Stadium	Indoor volleyball
Phnom Penh	Olympic Sports Complex	Olympic Center Marquee Tent	Gymnastics, Dancesport
Phnom Penh	Olympic Sports Complex	Pétanque Arena	Pétanque
Phnom Penh	Olympic Sports Complex	Swimming pool	Water polo
Phnom Penh	AEON Mall Sen Sok City		Billiards
Phnom Penh	Nagaworld 2, Olympia Mall		Esports
Phnom Penh	Army Stadium		Football
Phnom Penh	Prince Stadium		Football
Phnom Penh	Smart RSN Stadium		Football
Phnom Penh	Garden City Golf Club		Golf
Phnom Penh	Royal University of Phnom Penh		Xiangqi and Ouk chaktrang
Phnom Penh	AZ Group Cricket Oval		Cricket
Phnom Penh	Federation of Youth Hall		Teqball
Kampot	Aquatic Sport Center		Traditional boat race
Kep	Kep Beach		Endurance race
Siem Reap	Kulen Mountain		Mountain cycling
Siem Reap	Angkor Wat		Marathon and Road cycling
Sihanoukville	Sokha Beach		Jet ski, Sailing
Sihanoukville	Chumteav Mao Beach		Beach volleyball

=== Budget ===
According to Vongsey Vissoth, Minister attached to the Prime Minister and permanent secretary of state for the Ministry of Economy and Finance, building and setting up the facilities and fields required for the various competitions cost between $30–40 million.

Speaking at the public forum Macroeconomic Management and the 2023 Budget Law held in Phnom Penh on 25 January, Vissoth explained that setting up and hosting events at stadiums and other locations might end up costing more than $300 million. In preparation for the event, Cambodia built a number of infrastructures, as well as sports venues and sports facilities.

=== Volunteers ===
The National Volunteer Committee of the Cambodian 2023 Southeast Games Organizing Committee announced the recruitment of nearly 7,000 volunteers to assist at the SEA Games and ASEAN Para Games.

=== Torch relay ===
On 21 March 2023, with only less than 45 days before the start of the 32nd SEA Games, King Norodom Sihamoni ignited the torch using the secret flame and passed on the flame to the torch which took place at Angkor Wat. The height of the torch was 75 cm and weighted slightly over one kilogram. The top of the torch was designed to reflect the symbol of Rumduol (រំដួល), Cambodia's national flower and it was plated with gold color to show that the country and its people rose to the top. The design on the handle of the torch was filled with multiple kbach chan (ក្បាច់ចន្ទ) connected together to signify the unity in achieving peace and success for the country and Southeast Asia community.

The torch relay also began its journey to all other 9 countries in Southeast Asia starting on 24 March before returning back on 28 April. Below is the list of the torch relay run date in each country:

2023 SEA Games torch relay route.

24 March
1. Vietnam
27 March
2. Philippines
1 April
3. Indonesia

4 April
4. Timor-Leste
11 April
5. Malaysia
15 April
6. Singapore

17 April
7. Thailand
21 April
8. Myanmar
25 April
9. Laos

=== Ticketing, Broadcasting, and Accommodations ===
On 31 March, Cambodian Prime Minister Hun Sen announced all tickets for the 5 to 17 May, SEA Games would be free – for both Cambodians and foreigners, but the supporters had to book the tickets before each match to watch inside the stadium. Also international broadcasters were not charged for live television rights to cover the 608 events in 37 sports on offer.

Cambodia also fully covered spending on food and accommodation services for sport delegations. Delegates from all 11 countries participating in the SEA Games and the ASEAN Para Games were not required to pay $50 per person per day as had been the case with previous hosts.

== Marketing ==
=== Branding ===
The official logo and slogan for the 2023 Southeast Asian Games were decided on 2 July 2020 by the 2023 Cambodian SEA Games Organizing Committee and was officially unveiled on 7 August. A design competition for the games' logo was held in 2019 with the final design reportedly consisting of the Angkor Wat and four dragons as its main motifs. The initial slogan for the games unveiled was "Sport Into Peace". The logo was later slightly revised so it could also be used for the 2023 ASEAN Para Games, while the slogan in English was revised to "Sports Live in Peace".

A mascot design competition was also organized in 2019 which was open to Cambodian citizens who were at least 15 years of age. The contest required applicants to submit designs that followed a rabbit theme and reflected Khmer culture. The deadline for the competition was on 30 November 2019. The winning design consisted of two rabbits wearing Bokator attire; a female in red named Rumduol (រំដួល) and a male in blue named Borey (បុរី). Red and blue were colors from the Cambodian flag.

The official song of the Games was "Sports Live in Peace", performed by Preap Sovath, Aok Sokunkanha, Sok Seylalin, Ton Chanseyma and Sayaty.

=== Sponsors ===
Sponsors of the 2017 Southeast Asian Games
Exclusive Premium Sponsors
- National Bank of Canada (ABA Bank)
- AIA Group
- Cellcard
- Eau Kulen
- Vattanac Brewery
Premium Sponsors
- Ajinomoto
- Cambodia Airways
- Coca-Cola
- Ezecom
- FBT
- Heineken Asia Pacific (Anchor Beer)
National Partners
- Aeon
- Charoen Pokphand Foods
- Decathlon
- Động Lực Sport
- Legend Cinema
- NagaWorld
- Nestlé (Milo)
- Unilever (Clear)

== The Games ==
=== Ceremonies ===
The opening ceremony for the games was held on 5 May 2023, although the cricket and football tournaments commenced one week earlier on 29 April 2023.

The closing ceremony for the games was held on 17 May 2023.

=== Parade of Nations ===
Order	Nation	Flag bearer	Sport
1	Brunei Darussalam (BRU)	Ali Saifullah Suhaimi	Pencak silat
2	Indonesia (INA)	Flairene Candrea Wonomiharjo	Swimming
3	Lao PDR (LAO)	Soulasith Khamvongsa	Pétanque
4	Malaysia (MAS)	Sharmendran Raghunathan	Karate
5	Myanmar (MYA)	Aung Khaing Lin	Vovinam
6	Philippines (PHI)	Alyssa Valdez	Volleyball
7	Singapore (SGP)	Terry Tay Wei An	Gymnastics
8	Thailand (THA)	Chanatip Jakrawan	Basketball
9	Timor Leste (TLS)	Felisberto de Deus	Athletics
10	Vietnam (VIE)	Nguyễn Huy Hoàng	Swimming
11	Cambodia (CAM) (Host)	Prom Samnang	Kun Khmer

=== Participating nations ===
The 11 members of the Southeast Asian Games Federation (SAGF) participated in the 32nd SEA Games in Cambodia in 2023, with a total of 12,404 athletes and sports delegates in 584 events across 37 sports. Below is a list of all the participating NOCs.

Southeast Asian Games Federation

- Brunei (113)
- Cambodia (1158) (Host)
- Timor-Leste (171)
- Indonesia (599)
- Laos (656)
- Malaysia (1532)
- Myanmar (694)
- Philippines (1342)
- Singapore (1228)
- Thailand (1985)
- Vietnam (1663)

=== Sports ===
2023 SEA Games Sports

- Aquatics
  - Diving (4)
  - Swimming (39)
  - Finswimming (24)
  - Water polo (2)
- Athletics (47)
- Badminton (8)
- Basketball
  - 3x3 Basketball (2)
  - 5x5 Basketball (2)
- Billiards (10)
- Boxing (16)
- Chess
  - Xiangqi (4)
  - Ouk chaktrang (7)
- Cricket (8)
- Cycling
  - Mountain cycling (5)
  - Road cycling (4)
- Dancesport (2)
- Endurance race
  - Aquathlon (3)
  - Duathlon (2)
  - Triathlon (2)
- Esports (9)
- Fencing (12)
- Floorball (2)
- Football (2)
- Golf (4)
- Gymnastics
  - Aerobic (5)
  - Artistic (8)
- Hockey
  - Indoor hockey (2)
  - Field hockey (2)
- Jet ski (6)
- Judo (13)
- Karate (17)
- Martial arts
  - Arnis (12)
  - Jujitsu (13)
  - Kickboxing (17)
  - Kun Bokator
  - Kun Khmer
  - Vovinam (30)
- Obstacle race (4)
- Pétanque (11)
- Pencak silat (22)
- Sailing (9)
- Sepak takraw (21)
- Soft tennis (7)
- Table tennis (7)
- Taekwondo (24)
- Tennis (7)
- Traditional boat race (13)
- Volleyball (4)
  - Beach volleyball (2)
  - Indoor volleyball (2)
- Weightlifting (14)
- Wrestling (30)
- Wushu (22)
- Teqball (5)

== Calendar ==
The edition of the schedule was published by the National Olympic Committee of Cambodia.

All times and dates use Cambodian Standard Time (UTC+7).

OC	Opening ceremony	●	Event competitions	1	Gold medal events	CC	Closing ceremony

April/May 2023		April		May																	Events
April/May 2023		29 Sat	30 Sun	1 Mon	2 Tue	3 Wed	4 Thu	5 Fri	6 Sat	7 Sun	8 Mon	9 Tue	10 Wed	11 Thu	12 Fri	13 Sat	14 Sun	15 Mon	16 Tue	17 Wed	Events
Ceremonies								OC												CC	
Athletics									4		10	9	8	9	7						47
Aquatics	Diving										1	1	1	1							4
Aquatics	Finswimming														8	8	8				24
Aquatics	Swimming								6	7	6	7	7	6							39
Aquatics	Water polo														●	●	●	●	2		2
Badminton											●	●	1	2	●	●	●	●	5		8
Basketball	5x5 Basketball											●	●	●	●	●	●	●	2		2
Basketball	3x3 Basketball								●	2											2
Billiards										●	1	2	1	2	1	1	2				10
Boxing									●	●	●	●	●	●	●	8	8				16
Chess	Xiangqi														●	2	1	1			4
Chess	Ouk chaktrang	●	●	●	●	●	●		4	●	●	3									7
Cricket		●	●	●	●	●	●		●	1	●	●	1	1	●	1	●	2	2		8
Cycling	Road Race													2	1	1					4
Cycling	Mountain Biking								2	1	2										5
Dancesport																			2		2
Esports									1	2	●	1	1	1	●	●	2	1			9
Fencing														2	2	2	2	2	2		12
Floorball														●	●	●	●	●	2		2
Football		●	●		●	●	●		●	●	●	●	●	●	●	●	●	1	1		2
Golf											●	●	2	●	●	2					4
Gymnastics	Artistic										2	6									8
Gymnastics	Aerobic															3	2				5
Hockey	Field											●	●	●	●	●	●	●	2		2
Hockey	Indoor			●	●	●	●		●	2											2
Jet ski																●	●	●	6		6
Judo																2	5	5	1		13
Karate									6	9	2										17
Martial Arts	Arnis																4	4	4		12
Martial Arts	Jujitsu						3		5	5											13
Martial Arts	Kickboxing															●	●	6	11		17
Martial Arts	Kun Bokator						6		●	●	15										21
Martial Arts	Kun Khmer								2	●	●	●	8	9							19
Martial Arts	Vovinam								8	8	7	7									30
Obstacle race						●	●		2	2											4
Pencak silat									●	6	●	●	16								22
Pétanque									2	2	●	3	●	2	●	2					11
Sailing				●	●	●	●		●	●	9										9
Sepak takraw									3	3	3	2	2	●	●	3	●	2	3		21
Soft tennis									1	2	●	2	2								7
Table tennis												●	●	2	●	●	3	●	2		7
Taekwondo															8	6	6	4			24
Tennis									●	●	●	2	●	●	●	3	2				7
Traditional boat race																5	4		4		13
Triathlon / Duathlon / Aquathlon									3	2	2										7
Volleyball	Indoor					●	●		●	●	1	●	●	●		●	1				2
Volleyball	Beach													●	●	●	●	●	2		2
Weightlifting																4	4	3	3		14
Wrestling																	10	10	10		30
Wushu													4	4	14						22
Daily Gold Medal Events		0	0	0	0	0	9	0	49	54	61	45	54	43	41	53	64	41	66	0	580
Cumulative total		0	0	0	0	0	9	9	58	112	173	218	272	315	356	409	473	514	580	580	580
Demonstration Event
Teqball									●	●	5										5
		29 Sat	30 Sun	1 Mon	2 Tue	3 Wed	4 Thu	5 Fri	6 Sat	7 Sun	8 Mon	9 Tue	10 Wed	11 Thu	12 Fri	13 Sat	14 Sun	15 Mon	16 Tue	17 Wed	Total events
		April		May																	Total events

== Medal table ==
Key

* Host nation (Cambodia)

2023 SEA Games medal table
Rank	Nation	Gold	Silver	Bronze	Total
1	Vietnam	136	105	114	355
2	Thailand	108	96	108	312
3	Indonesia	87	80	109	276
4	Cambodia*	81	74	127	282
5	Philippines	58	86	116	260
6	Singapore	51	43	64	158
7	Malaysia	34	45	96	175
8	Myanmar	21	25	68	114
9	Laos	6	22	60	88
10	Brunei	2	1	6	9
11	Timor-Leste	0	0	8	8
Totals (11 entries)		584	577	876	2,037

Source: 2023 SEA Games Medal Tally

== Concerns and controversies ==
=== IFMA-led boycott of Kun Khmer competition ===
In July 2022, the Cambodian SEA Games Organizing Committee decided to link Muay Thai to Kun Khmer and used the name "Kun Khmer (Muay)" as the official name for the competition. This action resulted from the displeasure of the Cambodian public, who criticized the organizing committee for not displaying sufficient patriotism in its promotion of Cambodia's traditional martial arts.

Afterwards, International Federation of Muaythai Associations (IFMA), the international federation of Muay Thai, has claimed that the organizing committee was seeking to work with an organization that is not recognized by the International Olympic Committee (IOC) and the Olympic Council of Asia (OCA) as the sanctioning body for the competition. The IFMA was planning to bring this matter to the attention of the IOC, the IOC Ethics Commission, the OCA, and the World Anti-Doping Agency (WADA).

In January 2023, the IFMA sent warnings to each national federation to stop sending their teams to compete in the Kun Khmer competition, otherwise the violating national federations will be banned from upcoming World Games, Asian Indoor and Martial Arts Games, IFMA World Muaythai Championships, and other IFMA-sanctioned events.

=== Participation and medal cap ===
Participating nations are limited in the number of athletes they can enter in certain sports – for example martial arts, dragon boat, and esports, while such restriction is not applied to the host country. The Philippines, which claims to be backed by other participating nations aside from the host, has protested such regulation alleging it to be a strategy for Cambodia to finish at least fourth in the medal tally.

The Philippines protested Cambodia's plan to only allow a maximum of two gold medals to be awarded to a competitor in the gymnastics events. This was later revised to three following a complaint from the Gymnastics Association of the Philippines.

In the men's cross country mountain biking cycling event, originally Indonesia made a podium sweep. However, according to the rules of the SEA Games Federation (SEAGF) article 37 paragraph C which prohibits the same country from sweeping the medals in one event. This regulation has been in force since 30 May 2010. Thus third place finisher Ihza Muhammad was not awarded the bronze medal, which went to the fourth place rider Khim Menglong of Cambodia.

In badminton, the newly introduced mixed team event came with participation restrictions. The countries affected by this restriction are Indonesia, Malaysia, the Philippines, Singapore, Thailand, and Vietnam. Usually, badminton has seven gold medals in contention with two medals from the men's and women's team events, and five from the individual events. Bambang Roedyanto, a technical official for the games, claimed that "Cambodia [wanted] the opportunity to win medals from [badminton], so [the mixed team event] was held with countries [with developing badminton teams]".

=== Upside down flag incident ===
At the opening ceremony of the 2023 Southeast Asian Games which was held at the Morodok Techo National Stadium on Friday, 5 May 2023, multiple Burmese, Indonesian, and Vietnamese flag carried by several back-up dancers appeared to be upside-down in a performance by a local artist during the pre-show of the opening ceremony.

Responding to this incident, the Indonesian Olympic Committee sent out an official letter of objection to the Cambodian 2023 Southeast Games Organizing Committee. Indonesian Olympic Committee Secretary General Harry Warganegara confirmed that Cambodia had submitted an apology to Indonesia, promising and ensuring that this incident would not be repeated in the duration of the games. Indonesian sports minister Dito Ariotedjo received an apology from his Cambodian counterpart Hangchuon Naron on the following day.

Aside from the apology from the Cambodian 2023 Southeast Games Organizing Committee, Town Production, a Cambodian broadcasting and media production company involved at the ceremony, also issued a statement of apology, describing the blunder as a "disrespectful mistake" and an "oversight". The production company also said that it will send letters of apology to the embassies of the three countries involved.

=== Organization ===
The condition of the facility for the 5-on-5 basketball tournament was highly criticized. As the event was held at a multi-purpose hall, the flooring used at the court was found to be made out of linoleum instead of wood. According to the Philippine team, the air-conditioning was also insufficient. Filipino athlete Calvin Oftana sustained a calf injury after slipping on the floor, thus ruling him out from the tournament before it even began. Because of this, head coach Chot Reyes criticized the quality of the flooring. The Singaporean assistant coach also criticized the facility, stating that their athletes were also injured due to the flooring.

In the men's 20km race walk award ceremony, lighting failure led to the organizers using car headlights to illuminate the podium.

In the athlete's village, the Indonesian badminton women's team room had a problem with a leaky room after heavy rain, just before competing. This was also experienced by several Indonesian athletes' rooms in the athletes' village. The leaked room was immediately coordinated with by the committee and have received repairs.

=== Judging and match issues ===
Filipina karateka Junna Tsukii protested the judges' decision to award her a silver medal in the women's −50 kg kumite event. After her bout against Malaysia karateka Shahmalarani Chandran ended in a tie, the judges remained split in voting the winner before the referee awarded the win to Shahmalarani. Tsukii refused to bow to her opponent and said in a post-match interview, "I was more active than her, but they chose her. I don't know what happened with this judge [sic]. I'm not happy with my medal". During the victory ceremony, she also refused to stand on the podium.

Malaysia hammer throw athlete Jackie Wong managed to make his final throw of 64.64m, which would've awarded him the gold medal, before his result was disallowed following a technical error by the judges, losing out to Thailand's Kittipong Boonmawan. Jackie and his team manager, Datuk R. Annamalai had both launched written protests, but both appeals were rejected by the organisers.

Indonesian pencak silat athlete Safira Dwi Meilani competed against Vietnamese athlete, Nguyễn Hoàng Hồng Ân in the women's class B (50–55 kg) final. When the match was less than 18 seconds left, Safira, who was ahead with a score of 61–43, received a controversial action from the referee. She was deemed injured and was disqualified by the referee. As a result, Hồng Ân was initially declared as the winner and the Indonesian team then appealed the controversial referee's decision. The appeal was granted; thus, Safira was also awarded the gold medal. Vietnamese team officials also protested to the organizers after they learned about the decision, requesting to start the match again or restarting from the remaining 18 seconds of the last round, leading to a scuffle between the officials of two countries. Hồng Ân still retain the gold medal as well, thus both athletes shared the gold medal and no silver medal was awarded.

In the Valorant mixed team event final match of the esports competition between Singapore and Indonesia, Indonesia was down 4–10 when the game took a technical pause that lasted for at least two hours, before the stream ended without a conclusion. The Indonesian squad claimed that the Singaporean team took advantage of an exploit, which would have given Singapore an unfair advantage over Indonesia. The game was not resumed, and players were told to return in the morning to complete the games. Indonesia later decided to forfeit, giving Singapore the gold. Juanita Tanjung, the brand ambassador for Indonesia in the SEA Games, stated that the team's decision to forfeit was done for "upholding the nation's dignity and considering the unfavorable conditions of the situation." The SEA Games Federation officials later decided to also award the gold medal to Indonesia, sharing it with Singapore.

In Pencak silat, Cambodian athlete Non Sromoachkroham won the gold medal in the Men's class U45 (–45 kg) category. However, Non did not participate in any matches from the start. With his opponents in the semi-final, Malaysia's Muhammad Khairul Shaddad Ardi, and the final, Indonesia's Bayu Lesmana, both walked out without any specific reasons. Lesmana's teammate later alleged that Cambodia forced their opponents to walkout from the match, in an attempt for the host Cambodia to win gold in every sports. A few days later, Indonesian silat head coach Indro Catur Haryono clarified that the withdrawal was agreed beforehand with the other nations to award a gold medal for Cambodia as a token of appreciation for including pencak silat in the Games.

In the men's football, chaos occurred in the match between the Indonesia and Thailand in the final match. Indonesian team players and officials had to be cleared from the pitch after they mistook the whistle blow signalling foul for full time whistle, thinking that Indonesia has won the match 2–1. The resulting free kick equalized the score and the first brawl started after Indonesian player Titan Agung pushed one of the Thai coaches who celebrated by running towards the Indonesian bench. After the extra time started, Indonesia player Irfan Jauhari immediately scored a goal which made the score change to 3–2 in favor of Indonesia. Another chaos ensued on the bench of the two teams as some Indonesian players and officials ran towards the Thai bench to celebrate the goal. In the videos that were shown, Indonesia coaching staffs and the team manager Sumardji, was beaten by several Thai coaching staffs and players, which resulted Sumardji's face flushed with bleeding from the nose and mouth. As a result of the incidents, the referee issued several red cards to the players and coaching staffs of both teams.

=== Player eligibility issues ===
While historically, several countries have fielded naturalized and/or heritage players who would be ineligible to play as a local in FIBA tournaments, Cambodia's decision of fielding teams composed almost entirely of naturalized athletes in basketball, alongside several sports, have been criticized, sparking debates on the rules of the games. The basketball tournaments do not follow FIBA eligibility rules; players only had to have citizenship of the country they seek to represent their national team in the games. This meant that every national team could field as much naturalized players or dual citizens regardless of whether they acquired their passport by the age of 16 or not as per FIBA rules as they can. Hosts Cambodia decided to field a roster full of naturalized players for their men's and women's 3x3 teams, the former which had one local player. The men's regular basketball team will have an additional 3 naturalized athletes, making the 5x5 Cambodia basketball team fielded a total of 6 naturalized players, all but one who has no Cambodian heritage. Cambodian basketball player Joshua Bo Noung lamented the decision of his country to field teams mostly of players with no Cambodian heritage. The decision to field naturalized players by the hosts were not received well in the Philippines. Indonesian sports minister Dito Ariotedjo expressed shock and confusion regarding the fielding of the players.

In cricket, Malaysia has questioned the eligibility of Cambodia's thirteen players who are naturalized. While only using just some of these players' passports as reference, the Malaysian Cricket Association has noted that these passports were only issued on April 23 or six days prior to the first match and has past the March 3 player shortlist deadline.

In badminton, Cambodia badminton player Chourng Meng was revealed to be Chinese badminton player Zhou Meng, who was the runner-up of 2019 BWF World Junior Championships. In a video that has gone viral, Chourng was suddenly pulled off the field by a man presumed to be Cambodian officials, while celebrating her victory in the final. Apart from leaving the field early, Chourng was also absent from the mixed team medal ceremony.

== Broadcasting ==
Country	Rights holder	Ref
Brunei	RTB	
Cambodia	Cambodia Sports Television; TVK	
Indonesia	TVRI Sport; MNC Media	
Malaysia	RTM; Astro	
Philippines	One Sports; Smart Communications	
Singapore	Mediacorp	
Thailand	MCOT HD; T Sports; GMM 25; One31	
Vietnam	VTV; VOV; Vietnamese Consortium; VTC; HTV; VOH; FPT; K+; MyTV	

Preceded by Hanoi	SEA Games; XXXII Southeast Asian Games (2023)	Succeeded by Bangkok–Chonburi
