= Charles Herman Vath =

German Catholic priest

The Right Reverend Monsignor Charles Herman Vath CBE, PA
- Priest of the Diocese of Hong Kong; Chief Executive of Caritas Hong Kong
- Church: Catholic Church
- Diocese: Hong Kong

Orders
- Ordination: 8 March 1952
- Rank: Protonotary Apostolic Supernumerary

Personal details
- Born: 12 October 1909 Niederlahnstein, German Empire
- Died: 18 August 1974 (aged 64) Bonn, West Germany
- Education: Beda College, Rome

Styles of Charles Herman Vath
- Reference style: The Right Reverend
- Spoken style: Monsignor
- Informal style: Father

Ordination history of Charles Herman Vath
History
Priestly ordination
- Date: March 8, 1952
- Place: Archbasilica of Saint John Lateran

Charles Herman Vath CBE, PA (Chinese: 華德中; Jyutping: Waa^{4} Dak^{1}zung^{1}; 12 October 1909 – 18 August 1975) was a German Roman Catholic priest of the Diocese of Hong Kong who has served as the chief executive of Caritas Hong Kong from 1958 to 1967. He was the founder of Caritas Hong Kong and played an important role in the development of refugee assistance and advocacy for Vietnamese boat people in Hong Kong.

== Biography ==
=== Early life ===
Vath was born on 12 October 1909 in Niederlahnstein, German Empire, to a Jewish family. His father and grandfather were sculptors. His mother, nee Cohen, was also Jewish and a leading member of the Zentrum, a Catholic political party active in pre-Nazi Germany. He was the first child and had three sisters and one brother. His father died when he was nine, so his grandmother and aunt began caring for him while his mother took up jobs.

=== Career ===
Vath moved to the United States for work in his twenties before venturing to China in the late 1920s in a group of nine teens where he arrived at Canton. There was successful, climbing the ranks at the German firm Bayer's while working in Shanghai, Canton, and other places in China. In Shanghai and Canton, he was outstanding as a hard-working members of whatever parish he belonged.

In 1948, he resigned his business post and entered the Pontifical Beda College in Rome, where he became the third-youngest seminarian. He was ordained on 8 March 1952 in the Archbasilica of Saint John Lateran and he was incardinated to the Diocese of Hong Kong. From 1953, he became the secretary general of Catholic Social Welfare Office of the diocese until 1969. In 1958, the office became an member of the Hong Kong Council of Social Service; and in 1962, it became Caritas Organization (now Caritas Hong Kong). Thus, he was also known as the founder of Caritas Hong Kong.

In 1958, Vath was appointed the chief executive and chairman of Caritas Hong Kong, where he remained until his resignation on 1967. Alongside his appointment in Caritas, Vath also serves the Catholic Centre as director and president from 1953 to 1965. In 1959, Vath established the German Catholic community in Hong Kong, which became known as the "German-speaking Catholic Congregation Hong Kong".

In 1961, he presented a report on Hong Kong refugees to a secular organization and advocated for their rights internationally. Same year, Pope John XXIII appointed Vath as Domestic Prelate, with the title of Monsignor. Three years later, he was elevated to the rank of Protonotary Apostolic Supernumerary. Then in 1970, Vath was awarded the Commander of the Order of the British Empire by Queen Elizabeth II.

Vath also invested into the Order of the Holy Sepulchre on 1965 by Cardinal Eugène Tisserant, Grand Master of the Order.

== Personal life and death ==
His grandfather and mother were both Jewish. His grandfather was converted to Christianity in 1841.

Vath died on 18 August 1974 at his residence at Bonn, West Germany, he was 64.

== Memorial ==
A secondary school located in Tung Chung, Hong Kong, Caritas Charles Vath College, was named in his honour.

== See also ==
- Diocese of Hong Kong
- Hong Kong Caritas
- Caritas Charles Vath College
