= Precious Blood Hospital (Caritas) =

- Caritas Hong Kong
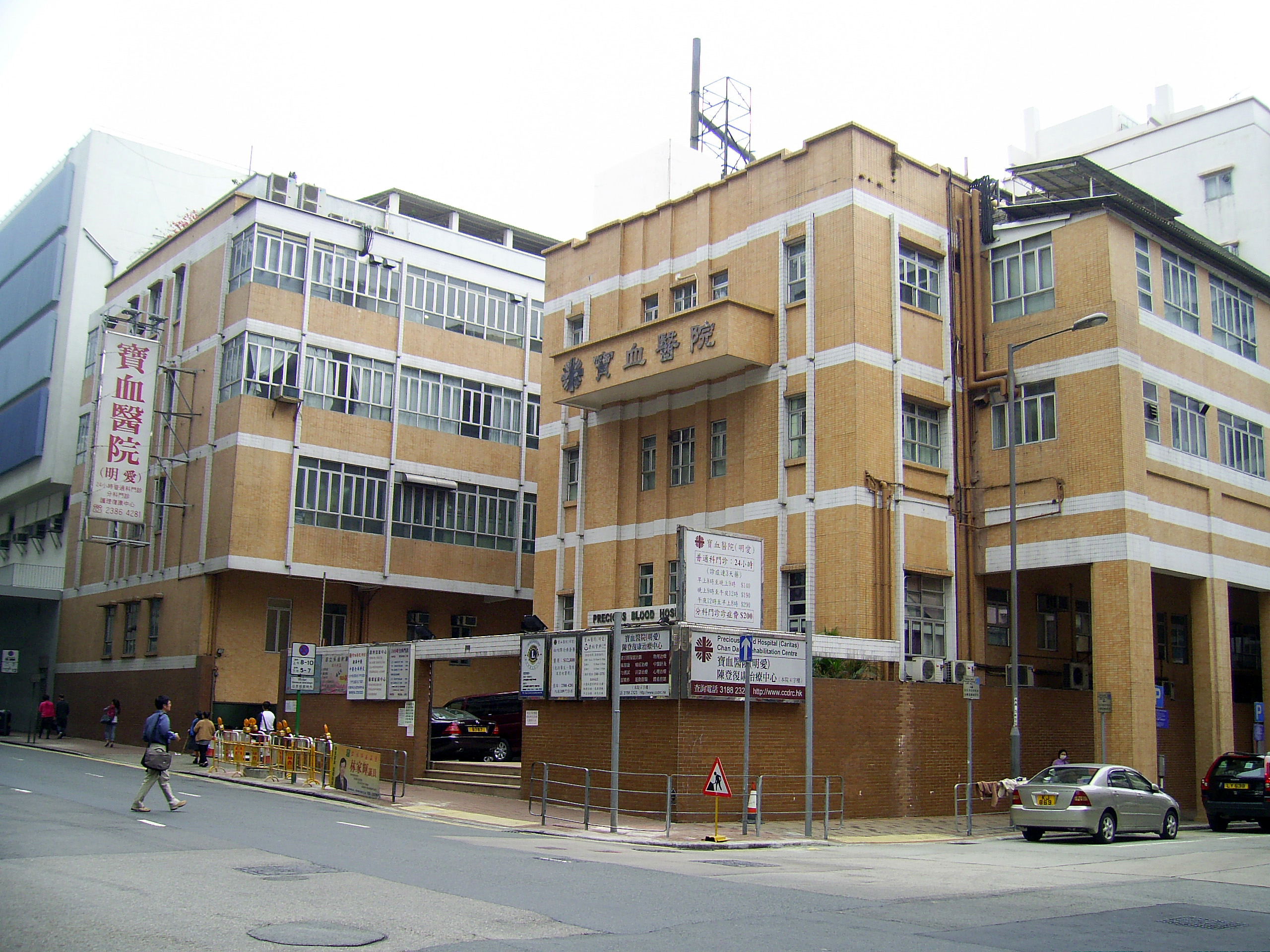
- Precious Blood Hospital (Caritas) in 2009

- Location within Hong Kong

Geography
- Location: 113 Castle Peak Road, Sham Shui Po, Hong Kong
- Coordinates: 22°20′02″N 114°09′42″E

Organisation
- Care system: Charitable, Non-profit
- Type: District General, Community
- Religious affiliation: Roman Catholic
- Patron: Sisters of the Precious Blood

Services
- Emergency department: No Accident & Emergency
- Beds: 176

History
- Founded: 27 July 1937; 88 years ago

Links
- Website: www.pbh.hk
- Lists: Hospitals in Hong Kong

Precious Blood Hospital (Caritas) (Chinese: 寶血醫院（明愛）) is a Roman Catholic Community Hospital in Hong Kong, located at No. 113 Castle Peak Road in the Sham Shui Po area of West Kowloon. It is a Roman Catholic Christian hospital, run by the Caritas group, as is Canossa Hospital.

== History ==
The Precious Blood Hospital is Charitable hospital created by Sister of the Precious Blood in July 1937, hospital has three wings. first two were built in 1937 and 1939. The third one, the George Washington Wing, was built in 1975. the building suffered considerable damage during the Japanese occupation of Hong Kong (1941–1945). The Hospital was under the administration of the Congregation of the Sisters of the Precious Blood until 1993, when Caritas group took charge of its management. The Hospital was consequently renamed as the Precious Blood Hospital (Caritas).

== Healthcare ==
Precious Blood Hospital offers specialist outpatient and inpatient services in General medicine, Surgery, Obstetrics and Gynaecology, Orthopaedics and Ophthalmology.

The hospital also runs a General Outpatient clinic and various health check and vaccination programs.

The hospital is a member of Hong Kong Private Hospitals Association. It is surveyed and accredited bi-annually by QHA Trent Accreditation of the United Kingdom, a major international healthcare accreditation group.

== See also ==
- Canossa Hospital, Hong Kong
- List of hospitals in Hong Kong
- Hospitals in China
- International healthcare accreditation
