= YMCA of Hong Kong Christian College =

Secondary school in Tung Chung, Hong Kong

- Chinese: 港青基信書院
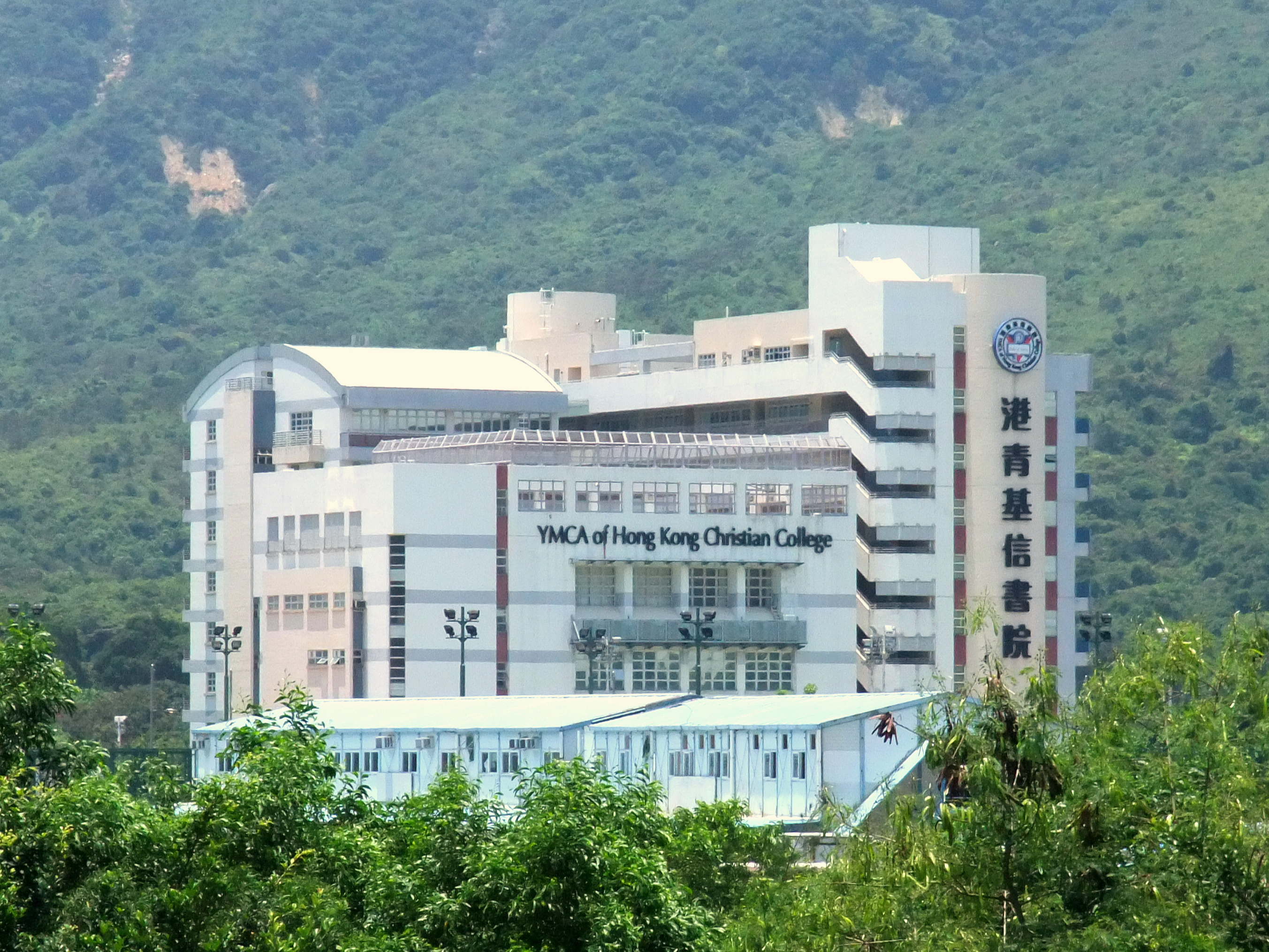
- College building

Location
- 2 Chung Yat Street, Tung Chung, Lantau Island by Mun Tung Estate; Hong Kong; 22°16′32″N 113°55′53″E

Information
- Type: Direct Subsidy Scheme secondary school
- Motto: Fides et Virtuos (faith and strength)
- Religious affiliation: Christianity
- Established: September 2003; 23 years ago
- School district: Islands District
- Principal: Diana Lo
- Faculty: around 100
- Grades: Form 1 to Form 6
- Gender: co-education
- Enrollment: around 900
- Average class size: 25
- Language: English
- Campus size: about 15,000 m^{2} (160,000 sq ft)
- Houses: Chambers, Morrison, Taylor and Williams
- Colors: white, blue, red
- Athletics: athletics, badminton, basketball, cheerleading, cricket, dragon boat, football, handball, hockey, rugby, swimming, table tennis, Taekwondo, tennis, and volleyball
- Publication: School Yearbook
- Affiliation: YMCA of Hong Kong
- Website: www.yhkcc.edu.hk

YMCA of Hong Kong Christian College
- Traditional Chinese: 港青基信書院
- Simplified Chinese: 港青基信书院
Transcriptions
Standard Mandarin
- Hanyu Pinyin: Gǎng Qīng Jī Xìn Shū yuàn
Yue: Cantonese
- Jyutping: gong2 cing1 gei1 seon3 syu1 jyun2

YMCA of Hong Kong Christian College (Chinese: 港青基信書院; Jyutping: gong2 cing1 gei1 seon3 syu1 jyun2), abbreviated as YHKCC, is a secondary school located at Tung Chung, Lantau Island, Hong Kong operated under the Direct Subsidy Scheme (DSS) of the Education Bureau. It is the first secondary school sponsored by the YMCA of Hong Kong.

The school is known as an international school at affordable costs, i.e. a local DSS college offering international learning environment and international curriculum. However, much of the curriculum in the international stream is still DSE-oriented, with Form 4 IGCSE students still having Citizenship and Social Development lessons 2.5 times a week, which is actually more than their DSE stream schoolmates of the same form 4. Additionally, there is a Chinese flag raising every week in Tuesday morning briefings. In the international atmosphere, 73% of the students in the school are international students, who come from over 40 countries. Over 40% of the school's teachers are from overseas.

== History ==
The school was established in September 2003. It was the first directly subsidised Christian secondary school sponsored by the YMCA of Hong Kong since its establishment in 1901. It was the only EMI school within Tung Chung.

Mrs. Rosalind Chan served as Principal from 2004 to 2009. In 2009, the new artificial turf pitch, running tracks and grass field were created.

At the 2009–2011 school year Dr. Nick Miller, former supervisor of the school, succeeded to serve as the principal. During the governing by Dr. Miller, the international curriculum was introduced to the school in 2010. A school concert of large scale was held in 2011.

The Hong Kong curriculum which consisted of the Hong Kong Certificate of Education Examination (HKCEE) and the Hong Kong Advanced Level Examination (HKALE) has been replaced by the Hong Kong Diploma of Secondary Education (HKDSE) as of 2012. The diverse culture, background, languages and curriculum of the school was highly praised by a politician during the graduation ceremony that year. The first ever International Fun Fair was held in December of that year.

Dr. Adrian Price took office as the new principal from the beginning of the 2012–2013 school year. But in May 2013, he suddenly resigned on private grounds. Starting from the school year 2013–2014, Mr. Dion Chen took over as principal. In May 2013, the school was visited by the Secretary for Education who observed the international atmosphere and education style as the uniqueness of the school. In June 2013, a new music block is dedicated during the graduation ceremony.

During a sports meeting in the Tsing Yi Sports Ground on 3 November 2014, some teachers learned that there were rumors among the students that some brownies and cupcakes containing marijuana were sold. The teachers later found two Form 4 female students of Croatian and British origin respectively in the stands. After the police arrived, they found five brownies and 22 cupcakes in a plastic bag, and found that the two students had discussed the sale of marijuana-containing cakes in a Facebook message. The government laboratory technician detected a total of 0.38 grams of cannabis derivatives in the cakes. The two have pleaded guilty to drug trafficking, and one of them was fined $10,000 at Tsuen Wan Magistrates' Courts.

In September 2016, the school provided new school uniform for boys and girls.

In 2018, the school's STEM Club demonstrated to the public as well as the Secretary for Education about the robotics inventions.

In 2019, it was the first time the school enrolled Form 1 students from SWYHKCS, an English private primary school located in Kowloon also sponsored by YMCA of Hong Kong, as a school network, where those students already received sufficient education of local curriculum for Chinese language and Mathematics education, international curriculum for English language and other subjects including STEM subjects corresponding to the education in the United Kingdom. After the protest on 1 September 2019, the school postponed the start of term until the next day because of considerable uncertainty resulting from the dangerous situation in Tung Chung station and the likelihood of traffic disruption. During the 2019–2020 Hong Kong protests, the school issued a letter-to-parent in November 2019 mentioning that games and social networking platforms were recently used to "entice, pressure and intimidate students into participating in protests in return for payment". The principal received an inquiry from Apple Daily and said that the above fact was notified by the Education Bureau.

In 2020, during the COVID-19 pandemic, classes are suspended and students are confined to distance education. Online learning was performed throughout the school period for all subjects. During the suspension period, a video was created by the Science Department of the school which explains the details of Coronavirus disease 2019. While the epidemic situation hinders parents' livelihood, the school helped bail out the tuition fees for next academic year. The school has paid or promised to pay more than HK$700,000 deposits to travel agencies for the purpose of organising study tours. When the government issued red tourism warnings to all overseas countries, travel agencies and airlines took the initiative to contact the school to discuss compensation arrangements. The IGCSE and GCE examinations were cancelled, though the school claimed that they were not too worried about the impact on further education of students, as most of them have already obtained conditional offers by that time. In February 2021, the school arranged for teachers to be forced COVID-19 testing for the whole school to resume classes, as the COVID-19 pandemic in Hong Kong has fallen. The principal told the entire school staff to be mentally prepared for testing.

On 8 February 2021, Principal Dion Chen announced he would be moving on to Ying Wa College. On 23 April 2021, it was announced during a school assembly that Diana Lo would succeed as principal. As of 1 September 2021, Diana Lo officially succeeded to serve as the principal.

=== History of principals ===
	Tenure	Name	Remarks
1	2003–2004	Dr. Alice Yuk	
2	2004–2009	Mrs. Rosalind Chan	She retired at the end of the 2008–2009 school year, and died in July 2017.
3	2009–2011	Dr. Nick Miller	He resigned and became Principal of Australian International School Singapore in January 2012, and died in April 2015.
4	2012–2013	Dr. Adrian Price	In May 2013, he suddenly resigned on private grounds.
5	2011–2012 (acting), 2013 (acting), 2013–2021	Dion Chen	Served at the school for 17 years upon departure. He resigned to become Principal of Ying Wa College.
6	2021–	Diana Lo	In 2003, she joined the YMCA of Hong Kong Christian College as one of its founding Science teachers. Since then, she has held the capacities of Head of Department, Head of Year, Head of the Pastoral Team, Head of Administration & Admissions, Assistant Principal, and Deputy Principal respectively.

== Campus environment ==
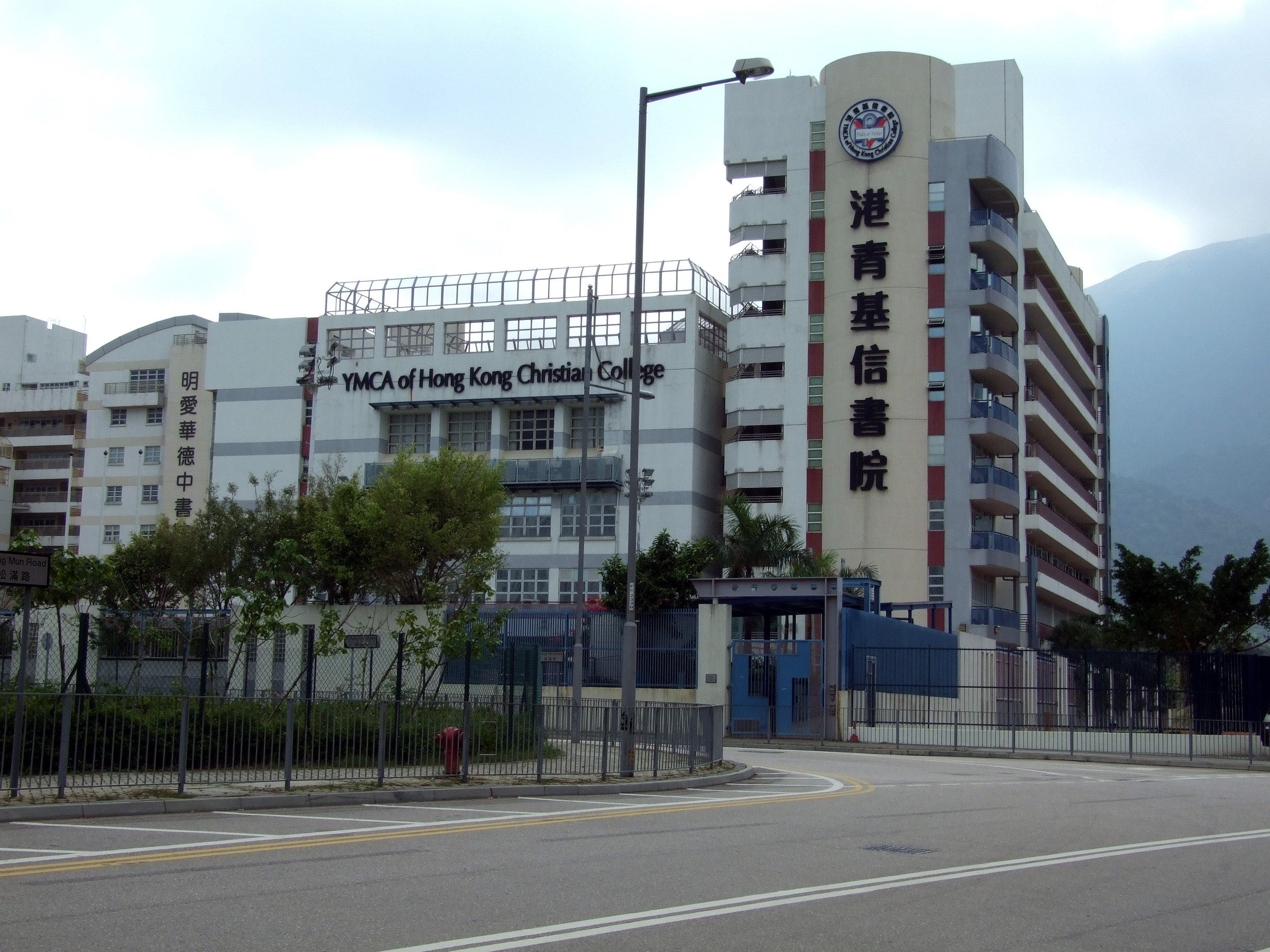
The main gate of the school.

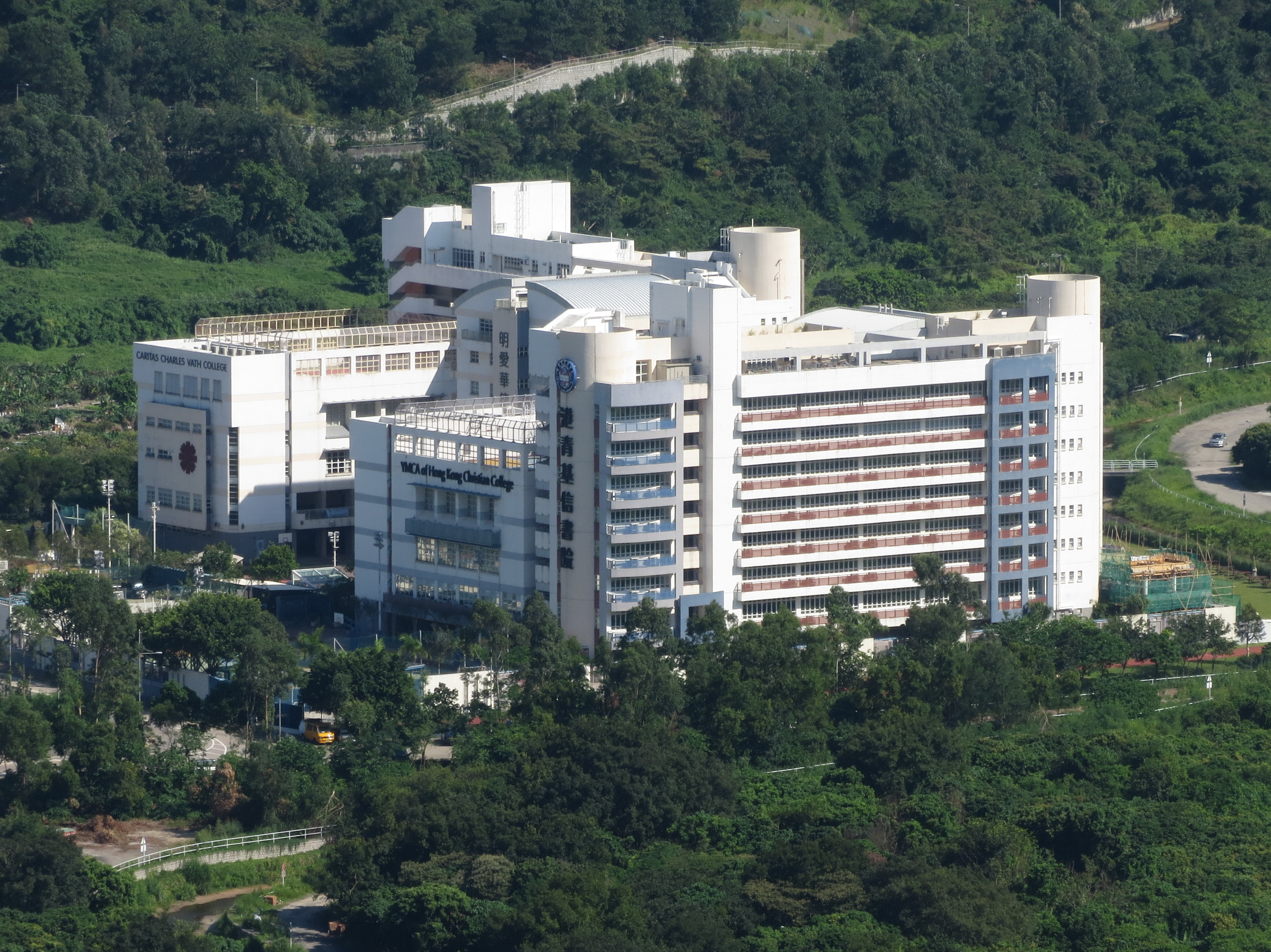
View of the school as seen from country park.

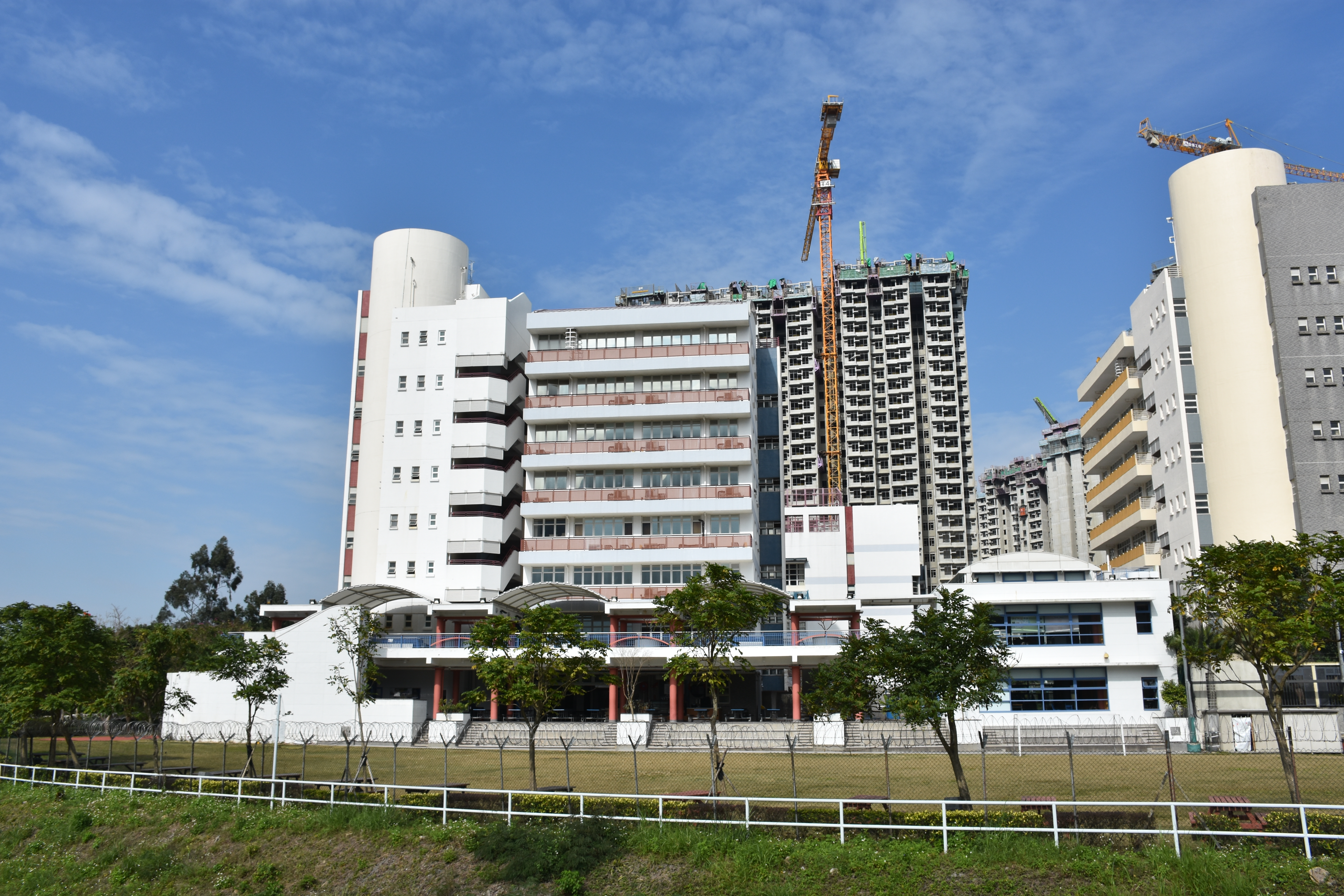
A large football pitch can be found in the rear side of the school.

The school is located at North Lantau New Town in Tung Chung, Lantau Island. It is adjacent to Mun Tung Estate and Caritas Wu Cheng-Chung College.

The school covers an area of about 15,000 square meters. The teaching building is eight stories high, with six classrooms on each of 1/F to 5/F. General facilities include a canteen currently operated by Sodexo on G/F, a careers centre and a reading corner on 1/F, an assembly hall on 2/F, and a library on 7/F.

Special rooms include a dance room on 1/F, a Chinese room on 2/F, a home economics room on 3/F, four laboratories on 4/F to 6/F, a black box theatre named Trinity Hall on 5/F, a STEM makerspace on 6/F, a fine arts centre on 7/F, and a fitness room on R/F.

There is an independent two-storey high building called Music Block which cost HK$26 million. This building consists of two studios.

Aside from the teaching building, there are many first-class sports facilities in the school, such as a four-lane 100-metre running track with a long jump sand-pit, a basketball court, an all-weather covered playground which is fully air-conditioned, and a multi-purpose turf pitch and grass field which usually serves as a football pitch.

== School emblem ==
The outermost circle in blue colour represents completeness, unity of the total of life, and God's created order. The inner circle represents friendship and love without end. The book with the school motto is Bible which represents faith and strength. The triangle in red represents Trinity, as well as the YMCA Movement. The Greek alphabets Χ and ρ in blue represents the word Christ.

== Academics ==
=== Teaching and learning ===
Academic departments include Chinese and Chinese History, English, Mathematics, Science, Humanities, Business, Physical education, and Visual arts.

All subjects at the school are taught in English, except second languages. Chinese language is for all students, in which the classes are divided into different level of difficulties according to the students' language background. Other second languages in the regular curriculum include Spanish language and French language.

The school provides various learning activities outside the classroom throughout the years, as well as organising inter-school competitions. With its alternative learning profile, the school provides flexible homework to students. The science department has conducted experiential learning activities on campus outside the classroom, which include physics corners, chemistry corners, science weeks and annual science talks with guest speakers etc. Innovative learning activities are also introduced to students to learn the latest technologies together with the theory.

In the STEM fields of studies, the school has purchased many equipments of latest technologies at school for the learning of students. Biotechnology workshops are offered by the school for the students studying science, which are rare opportunities in any secondary school settings in Hong Kong. Other STEM related equipments include astronomical telescopes for learning astronomy, six 3D printers for makers' projects with 3D printing, and programming robots of different brands and models.

The school offers both the Hong Kong and National Curriculum for England. The Hong Kong curriculum consists the Hong Kong Diploma of Secondary Education (HKDSE). The English National Curriculum comprises the International General Certificate of Secondary Education (IGCSE) and GCE A/AS-Level. No more than half of the students take the GCE course, and the rest take the DSE course. In the school, continuous assessments are adopted. Tests are given on a regular basis and examinations are held two times a year.

Students achieved outstanding IGCSE results. 43% of the students achieved A to A*, and 80% of the students achieved C or above, with a pass rate of 100%. 40% to 50% of the graduates were enrolled into universities for further studies every year, and most of them studied science or engineering in universities like University of Hong Kong, Chinese University of Hong Kong, Hong Kong University of Science and Technology, University of London, University of Newcastle, University of Glasgow, Cardiff University, University of Toronto and the University of British Columbia etc. In addition to science-related careers like nursing, graduates also work as English teachers, fitness coaches, football coaches or in hotels.

=== Class structure ===
There are Form 1 to 6 in the school, referring to grade 7 to grade 12 of international schools. There are six classes in every form. The classes are named as Y, M, C, A, H, and K. For examples, there exist 1A and 2K etc. The class sizes of Form 1 to 4 are about 24–29, whereas that of Form 5 to 6 are 17–26. School fees remains unchanged for Form 1 students for two years, and increases when they reaches Form 3 and again when they reaches Form 5.

The school does not use Chinese or English classes to distinguish between local students and non-Chinese speaking students, but mixes all students. Each level will only be divided into small classes in Chinese, English and Mathematics according to the level of students.

The Form 1 and 2 are of school-based curriculum. Students can study their own elective subjects starting from Form 3, in which it is the integrated curriculum of HKDSE and IGCSE. Students admitted to Hong Kong curriculum will have the HKDSE curriculum from Form 4 to 6. Students admitted to international curriculum will continue IGCSE in Form 4 for a public examination, then GCE AS-level at Form 5, and finally GCE A-level at Form 6.

=== External competitions ===
Students in the school are encouraged to take challenges in inter-school competitions. Students are awarded in different academic fields every year, for example International Biology Olympiad. Students of the school also perform well in debate and creative writings in both Chinese and English. Some of them were awarded championship.

In the STEM fields, STEM Club members were awarded in the EIE Robotic Challenge Junior 2018: Flying Robot and obtained First Class Awards and the Flying Robot Award (Advanced Group) and the first runner-up of the A.I. Self-driving Best Design Award in the EIE Robotics Challenge Junior 2019 organised by the Department of Electronic and Information Engineering, the Hong Kong Polytechnic University. In October 2019, the students of STEM Club made an instrument using the principle of electromagnetism, able to play the YMCA song. As an additional feature, they added a LEGO robot that can perform the YMCA hand gesture. In this competition, they won the second runner up in the music category, presented by Hong Kong Technology Education Association, Chinese University of Hong Kong.

=== Overseas events ===
Every year in late June, students can go overseas in the school's Enrichment Week since 2010. Students can join the Service Outreach Scheme or Work placement. The overseas placement is facilitated by the connection between the school and the YMCA centres of every city worldwide. Destinations include China, Taiwan, Cambodia, Philippines, Thailand, Vietnam and Malaysia.

There are also academic trips in summer holidays. Every year students who preferably study Physics can be selected to participate in the Future Pilot Training Programme organized by the Hong Kong Direct Subsidy Scheme Schools Council. The training venue is Bankstown Airport, Sydney, Australia and the campus of the University of New South Wales. Students could learn the Aviation Theory, safety issues and careers in aviation industry, navigation and map-reading, flight simulator sessions, 6–7 hours flight experience, cross country flight to Temora Aviation Museum, and an introduction to Boeing 737. Students also have university visits, cultural exchange and sightseeing.

Also the STEM Club members can be selected join the Astronomy Programme: Taiwan Astronomy Trip. On this trip they had the opportunity to go stargazing on Hehuanshan, visit the Lulin Observatory, talk to an astronomer, and visit the National Museum of Natural Science. Aside from this, they were also able to visit the Qingjing Farm, Sun Moon Lake, Gaomei Wetlands, and Tunghai University. This helped the students gain a better understanding of astronomy.

Top students studying Science can be selected to join the London International Youth Science Forum which is held across late July and early August in London.

Cultural exchange programmes are also organised every year. Destinations include Foshan, Spain, France etc.

=== Teaching team ===
There are around 100 teaching staffs in the school. The teacher to student ratio is 1:10 and the school claimed this causes examination results steadily improving. Over 40% of the teaching staffs come from overseas, including United Kingdom, United States, Canada, Australia, New Zealand, Ireland, Japan and India. The teachers in the school are capable with both local and international curriculum. The team cooperated with an ICT company to invent a VLE to facilitate the teaching and learning. There are also a full-time registered nurse, a career & higher education counsellor, two full-time social workers, a full-time educational psychologist and a full-time librarian etc.

== School characteristics ==
=== Students composition ===
Among the approximately 900 students at the school, 73% are foreign students from more than 40 countries or regions, including United States, Argentina, Australia, Austria, Bangladesh, Brazil, Belgium, Great Britain, Canada, China, Croatia, Denmark, Dominican Republic, Equatorial Guinea, France, Guatemala, Germany, Ghana, Hong Kong, Hungary, India, Indonesia, Ireland, Israel, Italy, Japan, South Africa, Sri Lanka, Sweden, Switzerland, Taiwan, Thailand, Turkey, Uganda, Vietnam, Zimbabwe, Kenya, Korea, Malaysia, Mexico, Namibia, Nepal, Netherlands, New Zealand, Nigeria, Pakistan, Philippines, Poland, Russia, Serbia and Singapore.

The school is described as a little United Nations. Actually the students join the inter-school community of international schools.

=== Student organisations ===
The Student Council is elected from two or more cabinets of students every year. The Prefect Team and Student Ambassadors are selected by teachers as student leader groups.

The House system consists of four houses. Chambers House was named in commemoration of Oswald Chambers for his contributions as a YMCA chaplain during World War I. Morrison House and Taylor House were named in commemoration of Robert Morrison and Hudson Taylor respectively for their contributions to the promotion of Christianity as well as their general education for people in Qing China. Williams House was named in commemoration of George Williams for his contributions as a founder of YMCA on 6 June 1844.

Interest and cultural groups include Board Games Club, Debate Teams, Creative Media Club, Creative Writing Club, Dance Team, Drama Club, Fine Art Photography Club, Handicraft Club, Home Economics Club, Literacy Leaders and Reading Club, and STEM Club. Music groups include Assembly Band, Beat Club, Choir, Chinese Instrumental Ensemble, and Orchestra.

Service and spirit groups include Catering Team, Christian Fellowship, Community Service Group, The Hong Kong Award for Young People, Green Club & Ambassador, Scout, Stage Management Crew, and Student Librarian.

=== Outstanding in sports ===
An annual Sports Day is held at Tsing Yi Sports Ground and the annual Swimming Gala is held in Tung Chung Swimming Pool.

Sports teams and clubs perform well in most inter-school competitions. They include athletics and cross-country, badminton, basketball, cheerleading, cricket, dodgeball, dragon boat, fencing, football, handball, hockey, rugby, swimming, table tennis, Taekwondo, tennis, and volleyball teams.

=== Life-Wide-Learning camp ===
The school organises three-day-two-night Life-Wide-Learning camp for junior form students in every Autumn to replace one-day picnic as their other learning experience. Camping sites include Sai Kung Peninsula etc. However, in recent years, over-night camps have been cancelled due to COVID-19 pandemic in Hong Kong.

== Public events ==
Starting from 2012, the International Fun Fair (IFF) is held by the students and teachers at the school in every December, which is succeeding the Family Fun Fair and the International Night until 2011. Visitors can enjoy ethnic food, a bazaar, games, bouncy castles and an art exhibition at the school. Visitors can also catch talent shows in the afternoon and evening, featuring the songs and dances of different countries worldwide. More than 4,000 and up to 10,000 people visit each IFF.

== International connections ==
The school connects to the YMCA centres from all cities in the world. Many schools or organisations sponsored by different YMCA centres in the world come to visit Hong Kong with the accompaniment of the school. Also, the school also make use of the YMCA facilities of other cities during its overseas events such as Service Outreach Scheme programme.

The school has many connections with organisations worldwide, such as Watoto Children's Choir etc. These connections provide different learning opportunities to the students.

Having a large number of international students, the school has built up connections and understandings with other educational institutes to strengthen the collaboration in providing articulation opportunities for non-Chinese speaking secondary school students.

== Notable alumni ==
- Wu Chun Ming (Robbie Wu): a Hong Kong professional football player
- Andrea Maria Lagman: a Professional indoor hockey player. National team athlete for the Philippines. Andrea bagged a Bronze medal at her third international game representing the Philippines in the 2019 Southeast Asian Games. The pioneering team for the first medal for hockey in the Philippines.
- Mark Coebergh: a Hong Kong team rugby player
- Jordan Jarvis: a professional football player
- Stefan Antonić: an Indonesian professional footballer of partial Serbian descent who plays as a defender for Hong Kong Premier League club Southern District FC
- Kirsten Ashley (Lenar Bata): Advertising model, Hong Kong actress and former Miss Hong Kong 2021 contestant
- Sabay Lynam: Professional Rugby Player

== Transportation ==
The school can be reached by public by taking a New Lantao Bus of one of the following lines including 3M, 11, 23 and 34 from all districts over Lantau Island, 37, 37H, 38X, 39M from Tung Chung MTR station and B6 from Hong Kong–Zhuhai–Macau Bridge, Citybus route E11B from Hong Kong Island, E21A from Kowloon, Long Win Bus route E31 from Tsuen Wan, E36A from Yuen Long or S65 from Hong Kong International Airport.

Bus route list

Lung Tseng Tau bus stop at Tung Chung Road

- 3M (Between Mui Wo and Tung Chung station)
- 11 (Between Tai O and Tung Chung)
- 23 (Between Ngong Ping and Tung Chung)
- 34 (Between Shek Mun Kap and Tung Chung)

Chung Yat Street bus stop (School's main gate), only available during weekday morning peak hours

- 37 (Between Yat Tung Estate and Ying Tung Estate)
- 38X (Between Yat Tung Estate and Fu Tung Estate)

Mun Tung Estate Terminus

- 37H (Between North Lantau Hospital and Ying Tung Estate)
- 39M (Between Mun Tung Estate and Tung Chung station)
- B6 (Between Mun Tung Estate and Hong Kong–Zhuhai–Macau Bridge)
- E11B (Between Mun Tung Estate and Tin Hau station)
- E21A (Between Yat Tung Estate and Ho Man Tin)
- E31 (Between Yat Tung Estate and Tsuen Wan)
- E36A (Between Yat Tung Estate and Yuen Long)
- S65 (Between Mun Tung Estate and Hong Kong International Airport)

Adjacent facilities

- Mun Tung Estate
- Caritas Charles Vath College

The school provides school bus service for students on demand. School bus routes in the past include Tsing Yi, Tsuen Wan, Tuen Mun and Sham Tseng, Prince Edward and Kowloon Tong, Tin Shui Wai and Yuen Long.

== See also ==
- YMCA of Hong Kong
- San Wui Commercial Society YMCA of Hong Kong Christian School
