= Caritas Institute of Community Education =

Hong Kong institution of higher education

Caritas Institute of Community Education 明愛社區書院
- Established: 1 January 2014; 11 years ago
- Focus: higher education, vocational education
- Chair: Dr Lau Wai Keen, Paul
- Owner: Caritas Hong Kong
- Address: Room 506, Caritas House, 2 Caine Road, Hong Kong
- Location: Hong Kong
- Website: www.cice.edu.hk/en/

Caritas Institute of Community Education
- Traditional Chinese: 明愛社區書院
Transcriptions
Yue: Cantonese
- Yale Romanization: Mìhng oi séh kēui syū yuhn
- Jyutping: Ming^{4} oi^{3} se^{5} keoi^{1} syu^{1} jyun^{6*2}

The Caritas Institute of Community Education (Chinese: 明愛社區書院) is a private institution of higher education based in Hong Kong. It was created on 1 January 2014, by combining all community education schools managed by Caritas Hong Kong. The Institution aims to provide a combination of sub-degree and vocational training programmes. Courses offered by CICE are recognised by the Hong Kong Council for Accreditation of Academic and Vocational Qualifications up to QF Level 4.
