= Caritas St. Joseph Secondary School =

Secondary school in Tsing Yi Island, Hong Kong

Coordinates: 22.3568°N 114.1033°E

- Chinese: 明愛聖約瑟中學
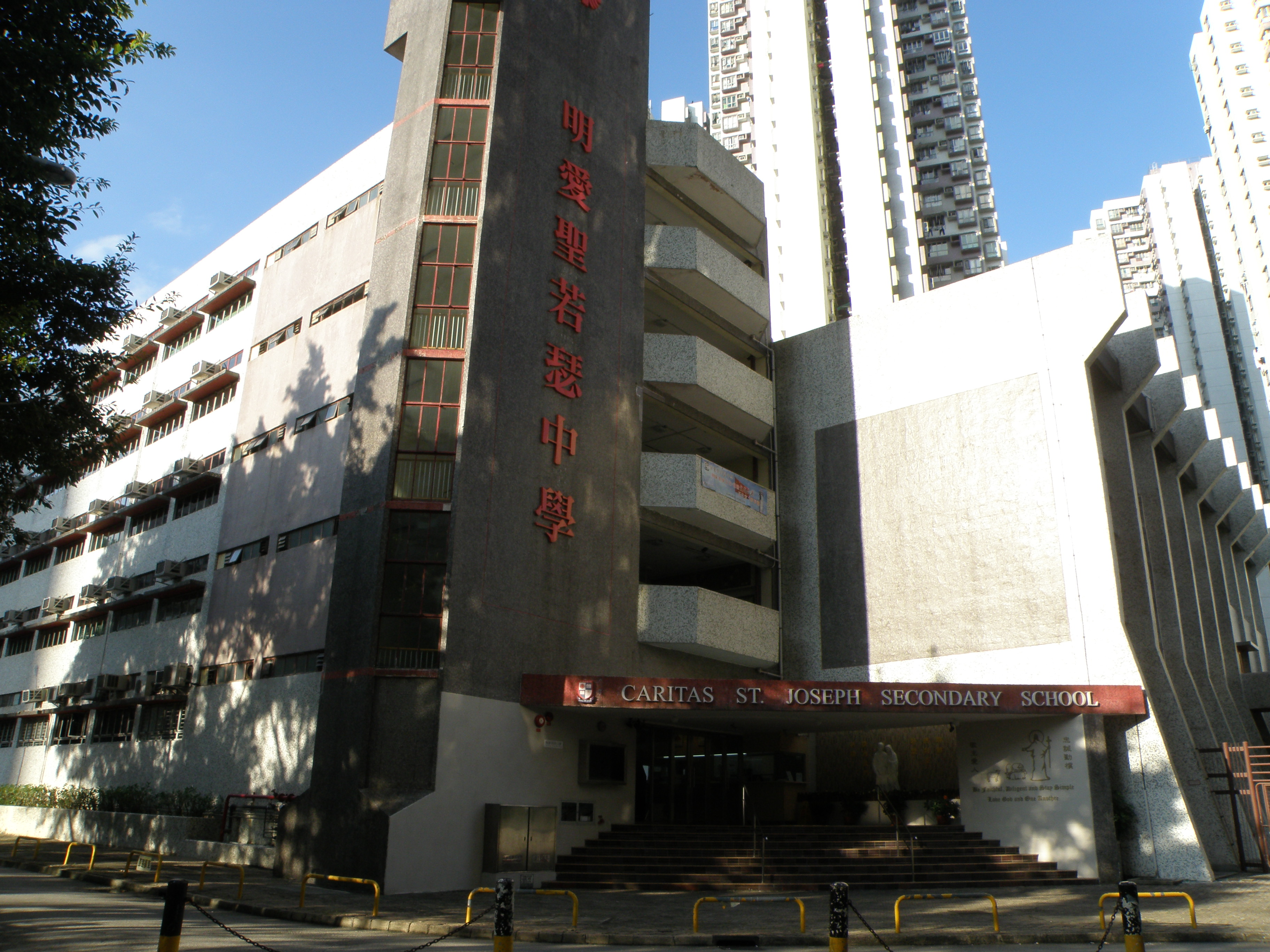

Information
- Former name: Caritas St. Joseph Prevocational School (1971–2001) (Chinese: 明愛聖若瑟職業先修學校)
- Website: www.csjss.edu.hk/it-school/php/webcms/public/mainpage/main.php3

Caritas St. Joseph Secondary School (Chinese: 明愛聖約瑟中學) is a vocational training secondary school in Tsing Yi Estate, Tsing Yi Island, Hong Kong. It was formerly, Caritas St. Joseph Prevocational School (明愛聖若瑟職業先修學校), a prevocational school established in Tsuen Wan by Caritas Hong Kong in 1971, and moved to the island in 1989. It was changed to its current name when the curriculum changed in 2001.
