= YMCA of Hong Kong =

Charitable organization in Hong Kong

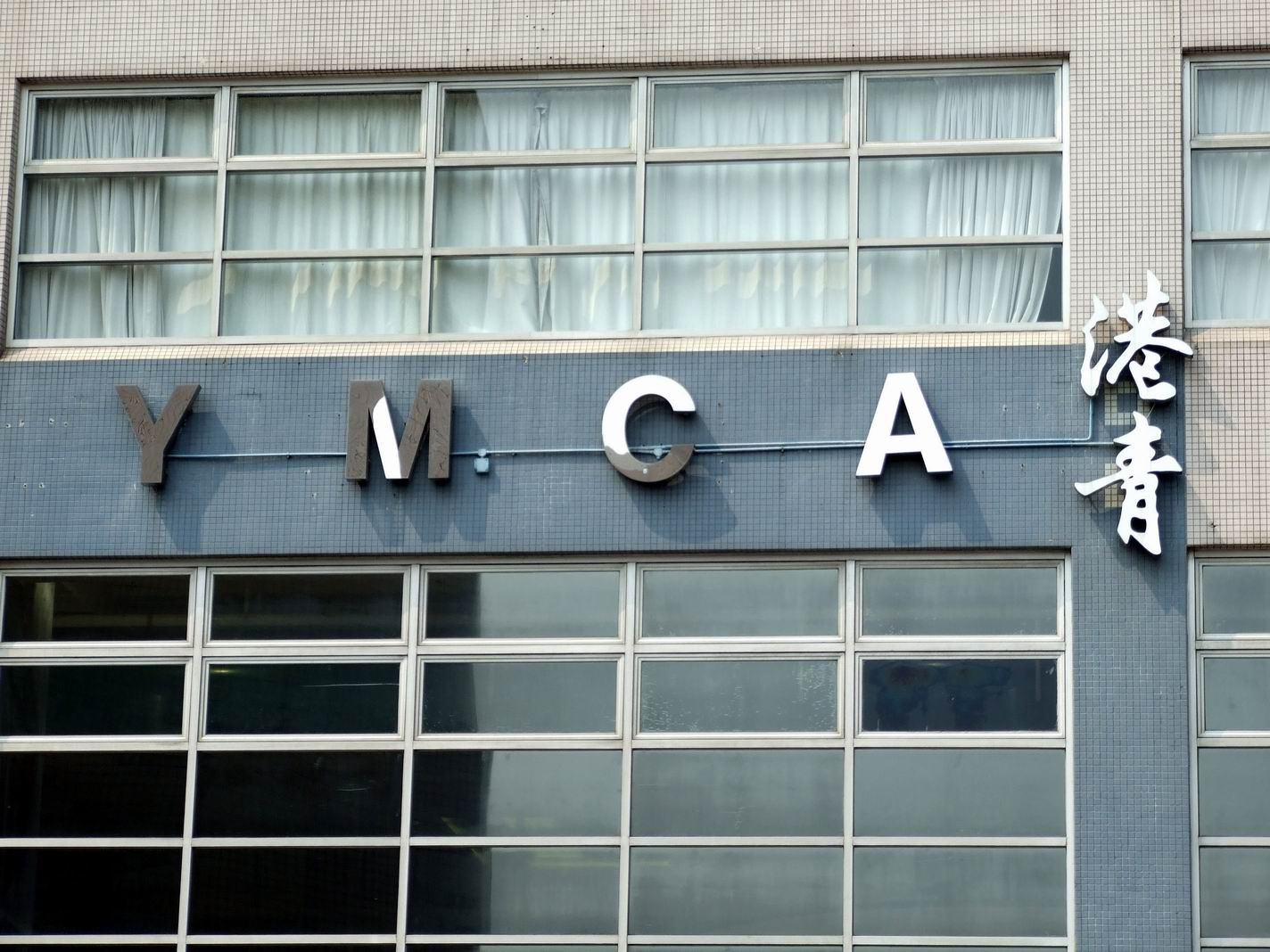
YMCA of Hong Kong referred to as "Hong Kong Youth"

YMCA of Hong Kong was established in 1901 as a charitable organization in Hong Kong, headquartered in Salisbury Road, Tsim Sha Tsui, Kowloon. It is dedicated to the furtherance of justice, peace, hope and truth in the Hong Kong and international community. It serves the community with cares for the people in needs and provides sponsorship for the events in Hong Kong. It is well known with its service of toy recycling for children.

== History ==
YMCA of Hong Kong is different from Chinese YMCA of Hong Kong. They are two independent organisations in Hong Kong. Both of them can be traced back to the same YMCA founded by George Williams in England, but founded differently in Hong Kong and provide different directions of service. When YMCA of Hong Kong was established in the early 20th century, most of its members were foreign nationals. With its role set as an "International YMCA", it will further be distinguished with the Chinese YMCA of Hong Kong and the YWCA of Hong Kong due to different target groups of serving.

Its founding director was Mr. Charles Montague Ede, and its general secretary was Mr. John Livingstone McPherson from 1905 to 1935. The recent general secretary is Mr. Peter Ho.

== Centres ==
=== The Salisbury ===
The Salisbury located in Tsim Sha Tsui was built in 1924 as a five-storey square building. It was rebuilt in July 1989 as a 16-storey building. Sports facilities include water sport facilities, indoor comprehensive sports hall (1 standard basketball court, 4 standard badminton courts and gymnastics facilities), 2 standard squash courts, dance studio, fitness centre, health centre and indoor rock climbing. Special sports include floor curling. The Salisbury hotel with 303 rooms and 62 suites is also among them. It has become one of the best hotels in Hong Kong with Harbor View Suite which is not so pricy and suit tourists with budget plans. The dining at the hotel is popular. Aside from the hotel rooms, The Salisbury also offers a swimming pool with swimming classes, multiple squash courts, and more for other activities sponsored by the YMCA.

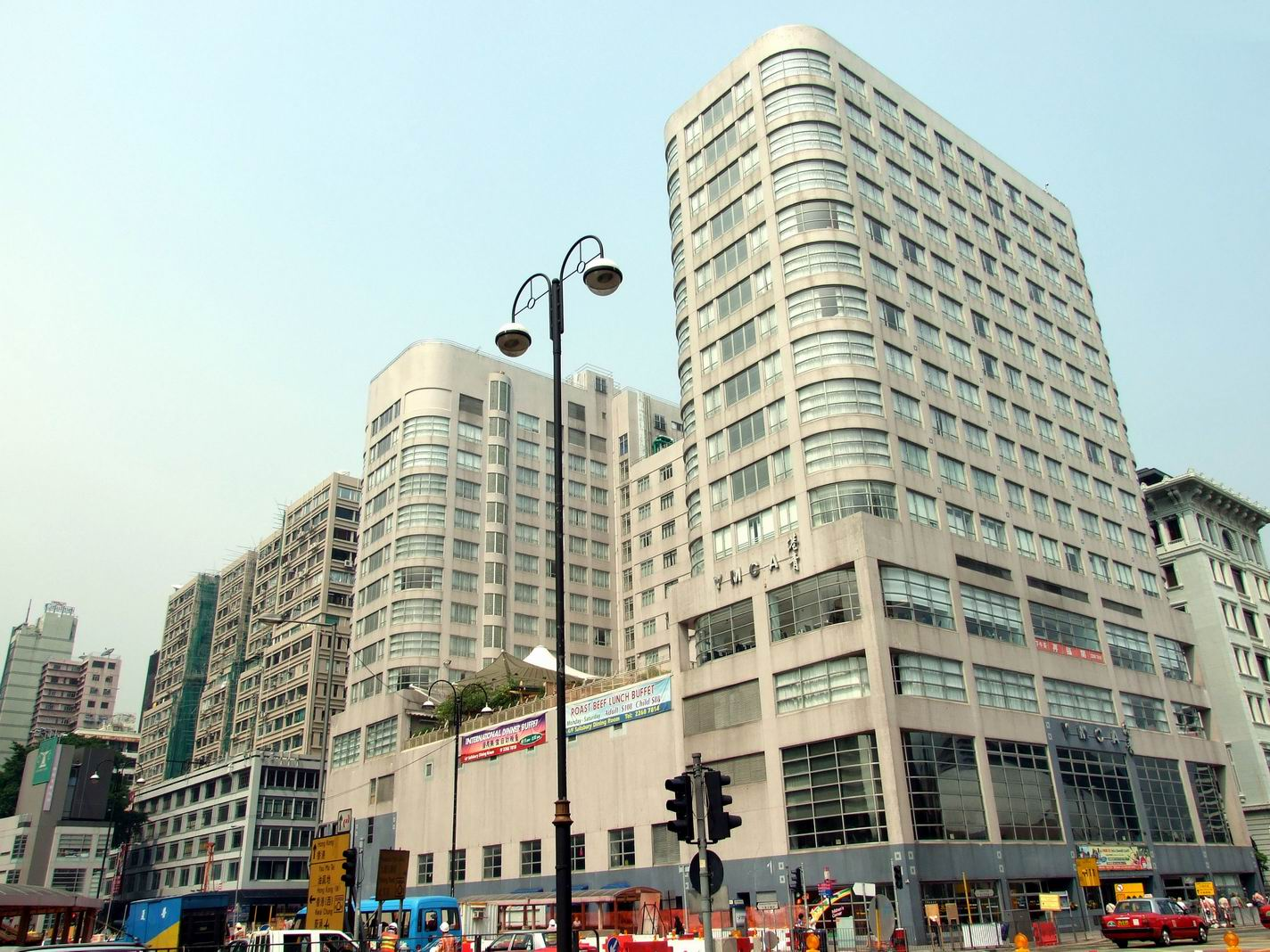
The Salisbury

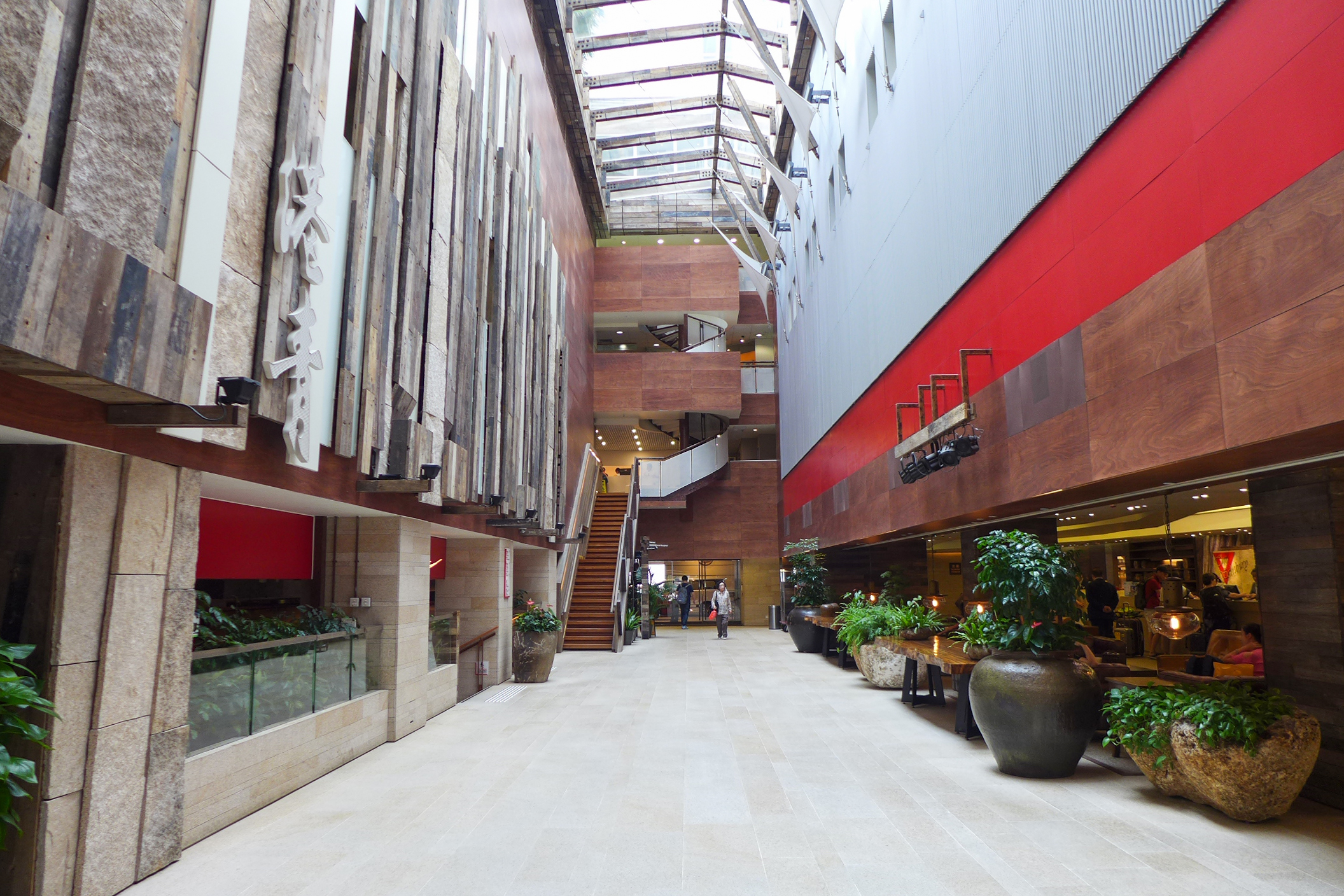
Lobby of The Salisbury

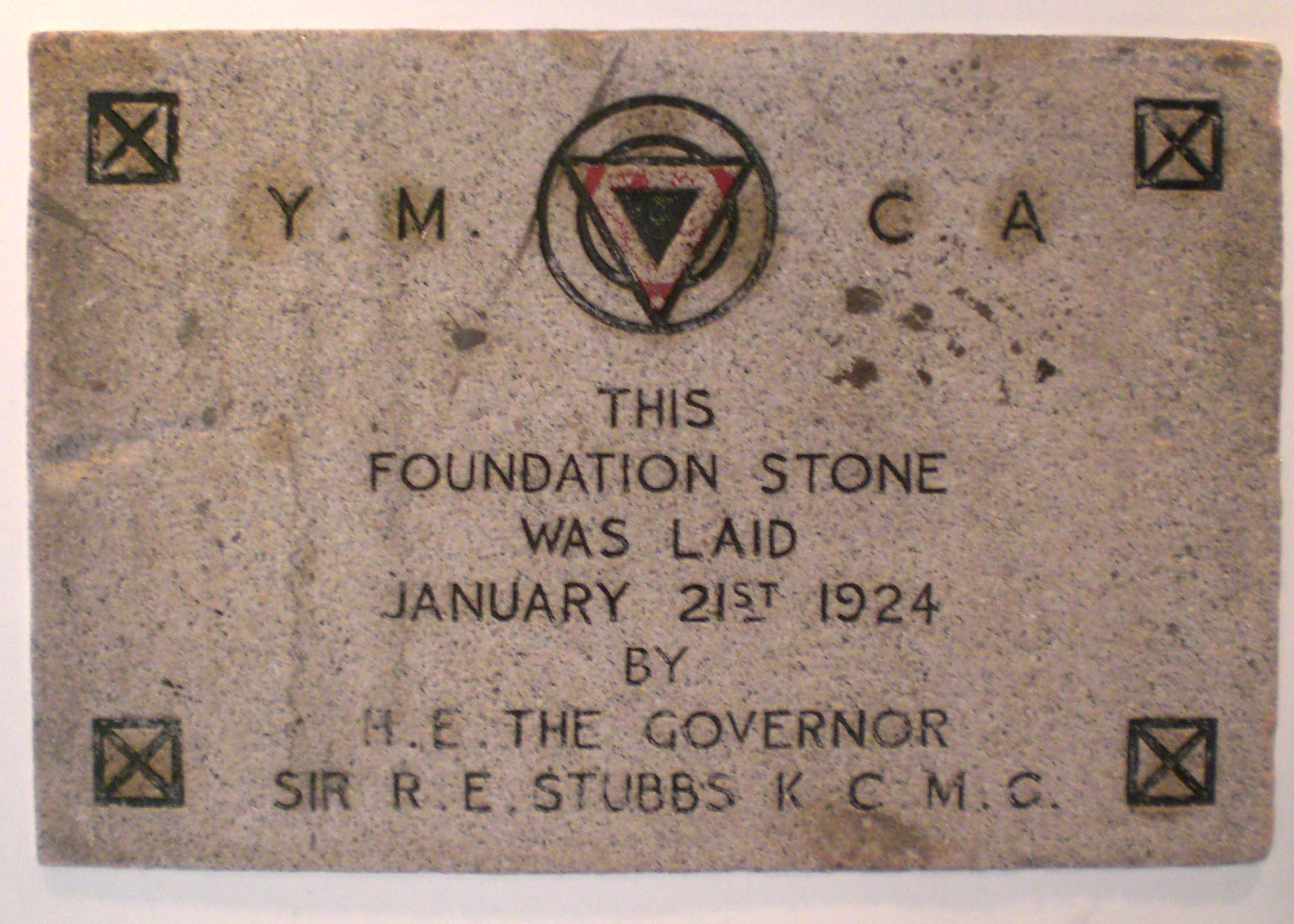
YMCA of Hong Kong Tsim Sha Tsui Club Foundation Stone launched by the Governor of Hong Kong Sir Reginald Edward Stubbs in January, 1924

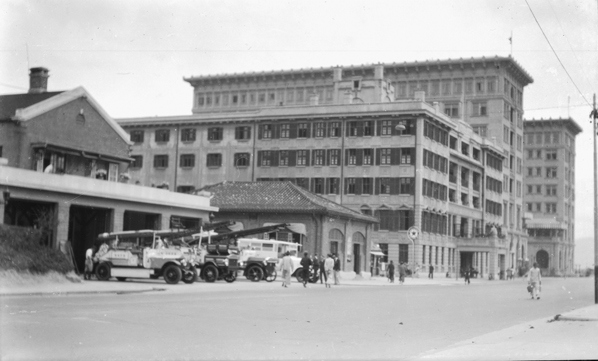
The Salisbury Road Center in the 1930s, with Old Kowloon Fire Station and The Peninsula Hong Kong

=== Cheung Sha Wan Center ===
YMCA Cheung Sha Wan Center is located at Cheung Sha Wan. It was put into service in December 1998. The main service targets are children and young people, parents, the elderly, new immigrants in Hong Kong, people in need, South Asian and low-income families in Sham Shui Po. The Centre has a computer resource centre, a multi-purpose computer training room, a home and home helper training room, a hotel room staff training room, a vocational skills training and testing centre, a dance and recreation room, a classroom and multi-purpose activity room, an auditorium and counselling and parent-child park.

== Education ==
=== Continuing Education ===
YMCA College of Continuing Education is located in the 6th floor of The Salisbury in Tsim Sha Tsui, a non-profit education founded in 1992. It also hold various of projects for educating young people about environmental protection.

=== Secondary school ===
YMCA of Hong Kong Christian College is a secondary school located at Tung Chung, Lantau Island operated under the Direct Subsidy Scheme (DSS) of the Education Bureau. It is the first secondary school sponsored by the YMCA of Hong Kong. This school was founded in 2003. The school develop based on the principles of YMCA, which include the aspects: curiosity, aspiration, resilience, enterprise and service. The five core values of the school include building a community that cares, serving one another in love, respecting ourselves and others, being responsible and acting with integrity. The school provides flexible homework to students.

This school is said to be an international school at low costs, i.e. a local DSS college offering international learning environment and international curriculum. In the international atmosphere, 73% of the students in the school are international students, who come from over 40 countries. Over 40% of the school's teachers are from overseas.

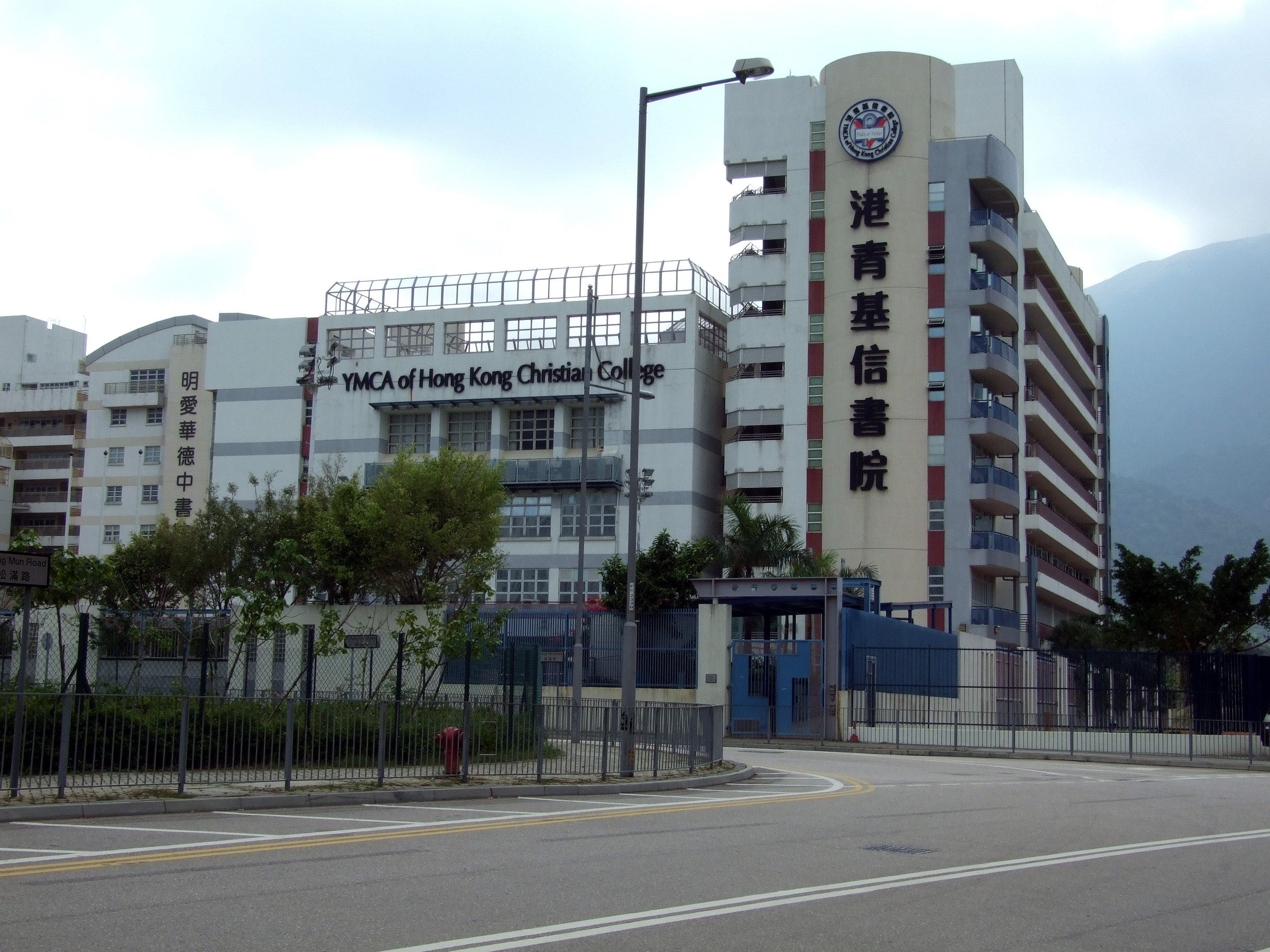
YMCA of Hong Kong Christian College

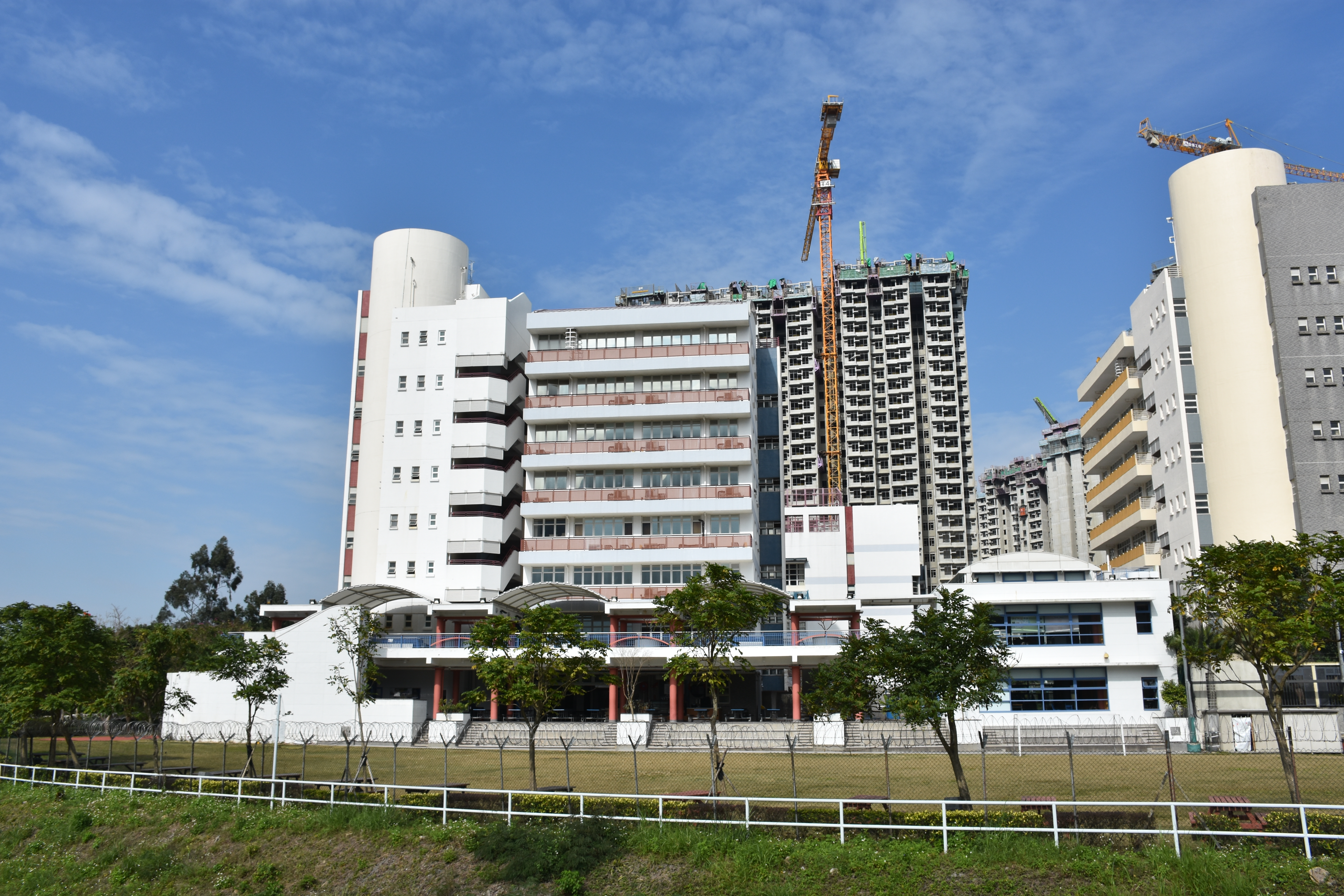
A large football pitch can be found in the rear side of YMCA of Hong Kong Christian College

=== Primary school ===
San Wui Commercial Society YMCA of Hong Kong Christian School is located in Sham Shui Po, Kowloon. It was co-organised by the YMCA of Hong Kong and San Wui Commercial Society. Since 2013, it was an English co-educational private primary school. From 2016, the school provides local curriculum for Chinese language and Mathematics, and international curriculum for English language and other subjects, as well as STEM subjects. Recently, the school practices Learn by doing corresponding to the education in the United Kingdom.

=== Kindergarten ===
There are currently four non-profit-funded full-time kindergartens operated by YMCA of Hong Kong, namely:

- YMCA of Hong Kong Christian International Kindergarten at Salisbury Road, Tsim Sha Tsui opened in 1992,
- YMCA of Hong Kong Christian International Kindergarten (West Kowloon) at Cheung Sha Wan, West Kowloon opened in 1998,
- YMCA of Hong Kong Christian Nursery School (Farm Road) at Farm Road, Kowloon City District opened in 1999 and
- YMCA of Hong Kong Christian Kindergarten (Kai Ching) at Kai Ching Estate, Kowloon City District opened in 2015.

All of them are located in Kowloon. They provide pre-school and primary leisure education services like arts and cultural courses.

== See also ==
- YMCA of Hong Kong Christian College
- Chinese YMCA of Hong Kong
