= Dion Chen =

Hong Kong educator (born 1979)

Dion Chen Principal
- 陳狄安

Principal of Ying Wa College

Former Principal of YMCA of Hong Kong Christian College
- In office 1 September 2013 – 31 August 2021
- Vice President: Diana Lo, Andrew Higgins
- Preceded by: Dr. Adrian Price
- Succeeded by: Diana Lo

Chairman of Hong Kong Direct Subsidy Scheme Schools Council

District Commissioner of New Territories Region Lantau Island District, Scout Association of Hong Kong

Deputy School Supervisor of San Wui Commercial Society YMCA of Hong Kong Christian School

Personal details
- Born: 1979 (age 46–47)
- Education: Tang Shiu Kin Victoria Government Secondary School; Newcastle University; University of Newcastle

Dion Chen (Chinese: 陳狄安; Jyutping: can4 dik6 on1) (1979 –) is an educator in Hong Kong. He is the principal of Ying Wa College, who assumed office on 1 September 2021.

Chen is well known for his effort on the alternative learning profile of students in the Direct Subsidy Scheme Schools (DSS) as well as his view on the second language teaching in Hong Kong. He was the principal of YMCA of Hong Kong Christian College, chairman of Hong Kong Direct Subsidy Scheme Schools Council, district commissioner of New Territories Region Lantau Island District, Scout Association of Hong Kong and deputy school supervisor of San Wui Commercial Society YMCA of Hong Kong Christian School.

== Early life and education ==
Chen's given names in both Chinese language and English language were assigned by his father as they were pronounced similarly in both languages.

Chen was educated in Hong Kong, the United Kingdom and Australia. He graduated from Tang Shiu Kin Victoria Government Secondary School (formerly named Tang Shiu Kin Victoria Technical School) in 1998. He obtained his bachelor's degree in Accounting and Financial Analysis from the Newcastle University, UK. He had a gap year between Year 2 and Year 3 of his study, and deferred his graduation.

While Chen was studying in the UK, because he didn't like to stop, he actively worked part-time. Chen shared seven part-time jobs in the UK as a helper cleaning the kitchen in a restaurant etc. Chen and his friends took care of business and helped people drain cleaning the canals and cleaned the kitchen, and experienced a different study abroad life. He later changed to contribute to the education sector.

Later he obtained a master's degree in Business from University of Newcastle, Australia. He also had a Post-graduate Diploma in Education and a Professional Diploma in ECA Management from the University of Hong Kong.

He is married and has two daughters.

== Career ==
Chen started his career in education in a special school in 2002. This brought him an understanding about teaching and learning to accommodate student's different learning needs. He joined the YMCA of Hong Kong Christian College in 2004 as a Business teacher mainly teaching the Hong Kong Advanced Level Examination (HKALE) programme. He was appointed as a HKALE marker by the Hong Kong Examination and Assessment Authority.

Chen became a member of the leadership team of his serving school since 2009. His works included continuing and sustaining the international curriculum (UK IGCSE and GCE A/AS-Level syllabuses) and a number of school campus development projects. During his tenure as a principal since 2013, the school has achieved its best academic results with excellent public examination results obtained. 43% of the students achieved A to A*, and 80% of the students achieved C or above, with a pass rate of 100%. 40% to 50% of the graduates were enrolled into universities for further studies every year.

To continue building a local school with international-style education, Chen managed to admit 73% of the students in the school from international students, who come from over 40 countries. He also continued to hire over 40% of the school's teachers from overseas. He promoted the school through the public events like Family Fun Fair, the International Night and the International Fun Fair (IFF) which promoted the school with the participation of the ethnic groups, featuring the songs and dances of different countries worldwide.

In management of his serving school, Chen invested from the school's budget on more teaching staffs. The teacher to student ratio is 1:10 and he claimed this causes examination results steadily improving. He required that the teachers in the school are capable with both local and international curriculum. His team cooperated with an ICT company to invent a VLE to facilitate the teaching and learning. He also hired a full-time registered nurse, a career & higher education counsellor, two full-time social workers, a full-time educational psychologist and a full-time librarian etc.

In September 2016, Chen's school provided new school uniform for boys and girls. Teachers have been told by Chen to keep an eye out for students with incorrect school uniforms. Girls wearing socks of the wrong length are forced to wait hours at the school office and miss class time; they are turned away even before school and sent home for showing an inch of their skin. This led the media to believe that Chen was depriving girls of their right to education, shamed girls for showing their ankles, and accused them of distracting boys and teachers. Teachers are told by Chen to enforce this little rule on a regular basis, devoting the time and energy they could use to prepare or make up lessons on it.

During the 2019–2020 Hong Kong protests, Chen's secondary school issued a notice in November 2019 announcing the resumption of classes. The article mentioned that the school was notified that games and social networking platforms were recently used to "entice, pressure and intimidate students into participating in protests in return for payment". The notice stated that no students were involved in the school, but parents and students were reminded to be vigilant when going online. Chen received an inquiry from Apple Daily and said that the above news was notified by a staff member of the Education Bureau. The staff suggested that the school should remind parents and students to pay attention. Chen stated that the school did not receive any reports from students or parents of the relevant situation. Because the Education Bureau is an official institution, Chen trusted them, so he did not question the authenticity of the information.

In 2020, during the COVID-19 pandemic, classes of the schools are suspended and students are confined to distance education. While the epidemic situation hinders parents' livelihood, Chen governed the school to help bail out the tuition fees for next academic year. In February 2021, Chen arranged for teachers to be forced COVID-19 testing and change the whole school to resume classes, as the COVID-19 pandemic in Hong Kong has fallen after the Lunar New Year.

On 8 February 2021, Chen announced he would not be renewing his contract at the end of the school year. He stated “I will be moving on to another school in Hong Kong at the end of this school year.” On 19 March 2021, Ying Wa College sent an e-notice to students stating that Chen would be taking over as principal of the school.

== Community services ==
Chen became the chairman of Hong Kong Direct Subsidy Scheme Schools Council, the chairman of Association of School Heads of Islands District, the councilor of Hong Kong Principals' Institute, the deputy school supervisor of San Wui Commercial Society YMCA of Hong Kong Christian School, the vice-chairman of Hong Kong Schools Sports Federation (HKSSF) Tsuen Wan & Islands Secondary School Areas Committee, the member of District Fight Crime Committee (Islands District) and Islands Youth Programme Committee, the district commissioner of New Territories Region and Lantau Island District, Scout Association of Hong Kong, the committee Member of Canoe Polo Committee of International Canoe Federation and the treasurer of E-club of Lantau, Rotary District 3450.

As the chairman of Hong Kong Direct Subsidy Scheme Schools Council, Chen took the responsibility of coordination of the DSS schools. Chen helped organising academic trips in summer holidays. Every year students who preferably study Physics can be selected through an interview to participate in the Future Pilot Training Programme organized by the Hong Kong Direct Subsidy Scheme Schools Council. In 2020, during the COVID-19 pandemic, many DSS schools have paid or promised to pay more than HK$700,000 deposits to travel agencies for the purpose of organising study tours, although the tours were all cancelled for the year. However, when the government decided to issue red tourism warnings during the COVID-19 pandemic in Hong Kong to all overseas countries, travel agencies and airlines took the initiative to contact Chen and the schools to discuss compensation arrangements. The IGCSE and GCE examinations were cancelled, though Chen claimed that the DSS schools were not too worried about the impact on further education of students, as most of them have already obtained conditional offers by that time.

== View and impact on alternative learning profiles ==
Chen emphasised that students could benefit from their study if they had alternative daily assessment, alternative curriculum and examination scope, and alternative path of further study.

Chen led his serving school with various learning activities outside classroom for the students throughout the years. With the large range of meaningful alternative learning profile, the school provides flexible homework to students. Students in his school were encouraged to take challenges in inter-school competitions. Chen encouraged the development of the school's own cheerleading team.

Chen and his team launched the Enrichment Week since 2010. Students could join the Service Outreach Scheme or Work placement. Destinations include China, Taiwan, Cambodia, Philippines, Thailand, Vietnam and Malaysia. Cultural exchange programmes are also organised every year. Destinations include Foshan, Spain, France etc.

Chen is familiar with DSE and GCE A-Level. He thinks GCE is more professional. Chen's serving school offers both the Hong Kong and National Curriculum for England. The Hong Kong curriculum consists the Hong Kong Diploma of Secondary Education (HKDSE). The English National Curriculum comprises the International General Certificate of Secondary Education (IGCSE) and GCE A/AS-Level, so that students could find the curriculum suit them most.

== View on second language teaching ==
As a school in Hong Kong being subsidised by the government, it has the responsibility to conduct classes of Chinese language. In Chen's serving school, all subjects at the school are taught in English, except second languages. Chinese language is for all students, in which the classes are divided into different level of difficulties according to the students' language background.

Chen stated in the media that most of the students in his serving school came from upper-level families. They are mainly children of management staff at the airport, as well as children of senior staff of large banks and even consuls. They are not permanent residents of Hong Kong. They have lack of motivation of learning Chinese, and have insufficient ability to handle the knowledge and skill of this second language. Chen tried to bargain with the government that the school could provide other second languages in the normal curriculum which include Spanish language and French language, but he failed.

To cater the learner's differences in the school with many international students, Chen does not use Chinese or English classes to distinguish between local students and non-Chinese speaking students, but mixes all students. Each level will only be divided into small classes in Chinese, English and Mathematics according to the level of students.

Having a large number of international students, Chen built up connections and understandings with other educational institutes to strengthen the collaboration in providing articulation opportunities for non-Chinese speaking secondary school students.
