= Caritas Charles Vath College =

Secondary school in Hong Kong

- Chinese: 明愛華德中書院
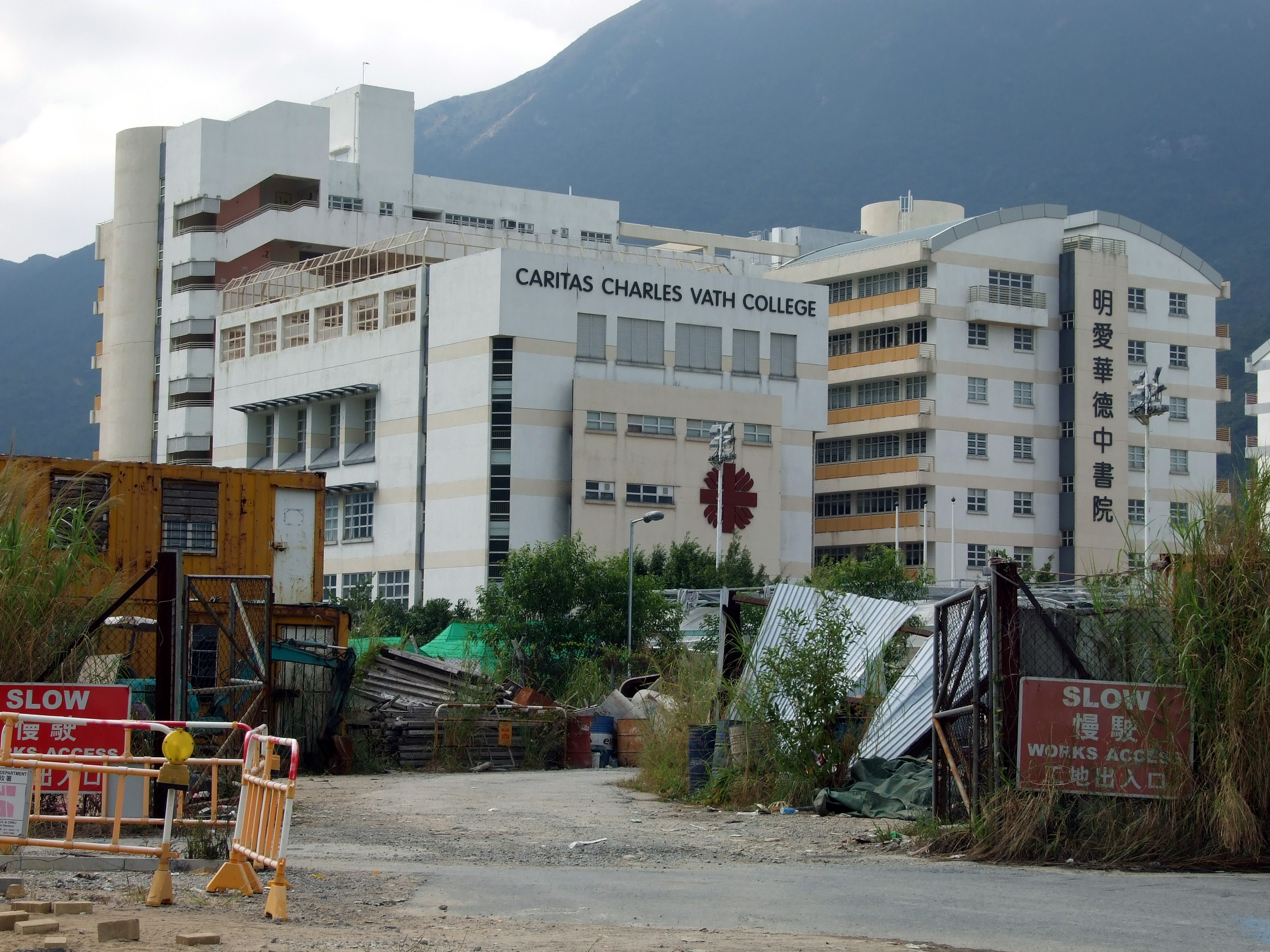

Location
- 4 Chung Yat Street, Tung Chung, Lantau Island; Hong Kong; 22.27510°N 113.93209°E

Information
- Type: Direct Subsidy Scheme secondary school
- Motto: Be Faithful, Diligent and Stay Simple, Love God and One Another (忠誠勤樸、敬主愛人)
- Religious affiliation: Catholic Church
- Established: 2003
- School district: Islands District
- Principal: Mr. Wong Wai
- Faculty: 10
- Grades: Form 4 to Form 6 (until 2020), Form 1 to Form 6 (from 2021)
- Gender: co-education
- Language: Chinese and English
- Campus size: about 7,600 m^{2} (82,000 sq ft)
- Affiliation: Caritas Hong Kong
- Website: www.ccvc.edu.hk

Caritas Charles Vath College
- Traditional Chinese: 明愛華德中書院
- Simplified Chinese: 明爱华德中书院
Transcriptions
Standard Mandarin
- Hanyu Pinyin: Míngài Huá Dézhōng Shūyuàn
Yue: Cantonese
- Jyutping: ming4 oi3 waa4 dak1 zung1 syu1 jyun2

Caritas Charles Vath College (Chinese: 明愛華德中書院), abbreviated as CCVC, is a discontinued secondary school located at Tung Chung, Lantau Island, Hong Kong, operated under the Direct Subsidy Scheme (DSS) of the Education Bureau. It was a secondary school sponsored by the Caritas Hong Kong established in 2003, with the former principal Mr. Wong Wai.

The school offered the Hong Kong Diploma of Secondary Education course (HKDSE) as a ladder for students to continue their studies. The courses were divided into three major categories, including art and design, Tourism and hospitality, and business, which let students choose more heuristic and multiple disciplinary subjects in addition to regular curriculum.

In 2024, Charitas Charles Vath College merged with Caritas Wu Cheng-chung Secondary School under the approval of the Education Bureau.

== History ==
Rev. Msgr. Charles Vath was the director of the Hong Kong Catholic Center, and the founder and president of Caritas Hong Kong since 1953. Caritas Hong Kong believes in caring for love and creating hope.

Until the 2000s, a group of Form 3 students were taken from every school without promoting to Form 4. Then there were a large number of Form 5 students leaving the school after Hong Kong Certificate of Education Examination (HKCEE). Under the past elitism system, students with poor academic performance would be eliminated. These students also had the right to receive education. Hong Kong's support for high school students is quite inadequate. This was also the reason for the appearance of senior high school in those years, which only admit students of Form 4 or above.

Caritas Charles Vath College is a DSS high school that was funded by the government in 2003. The school is a senior high school in Hong Kong, which mainly runs Form 4 and above. Before the implementation of the new high school curriculum, the students needed to go through the HKCEE and Hong Kong Advanced Level Examination (HKALE). During the two public examinations, many students became victims of the system and lost the opportunity to go directly to senior forms in the original school. For the students who intend to continue their studies, Caritas Charles Vath College's senior secondary courses opened up another path. In the past, the school provided a series of one-year professional certificate courses including the HKCEE, the HKALE.

After 2012, it changed to provide the HKDSE courses, as well as other courses covering tourism, cosmetology, design, electronics certificate courses.

In 2020, during the COVID-19 pandemic, classes were suspended and students were confined to distance education. Online learning was performed throughout the school period for all subjects.

The emergence of the HKDSE has brought shocks to the school. The school transformed. Starting from the 2020/2021 school year, the school set up junior high form classes. However, the school pays special attention to the purpose of helping the most lost and unsaved students did not change.

Due to the shrinking amount of Hong Kong students, Caritas moved Caritas Wu Cheng-chung Secondary School into Caritas Charles Vath College campus, with latter ceasing operations.

== Campus environment ==
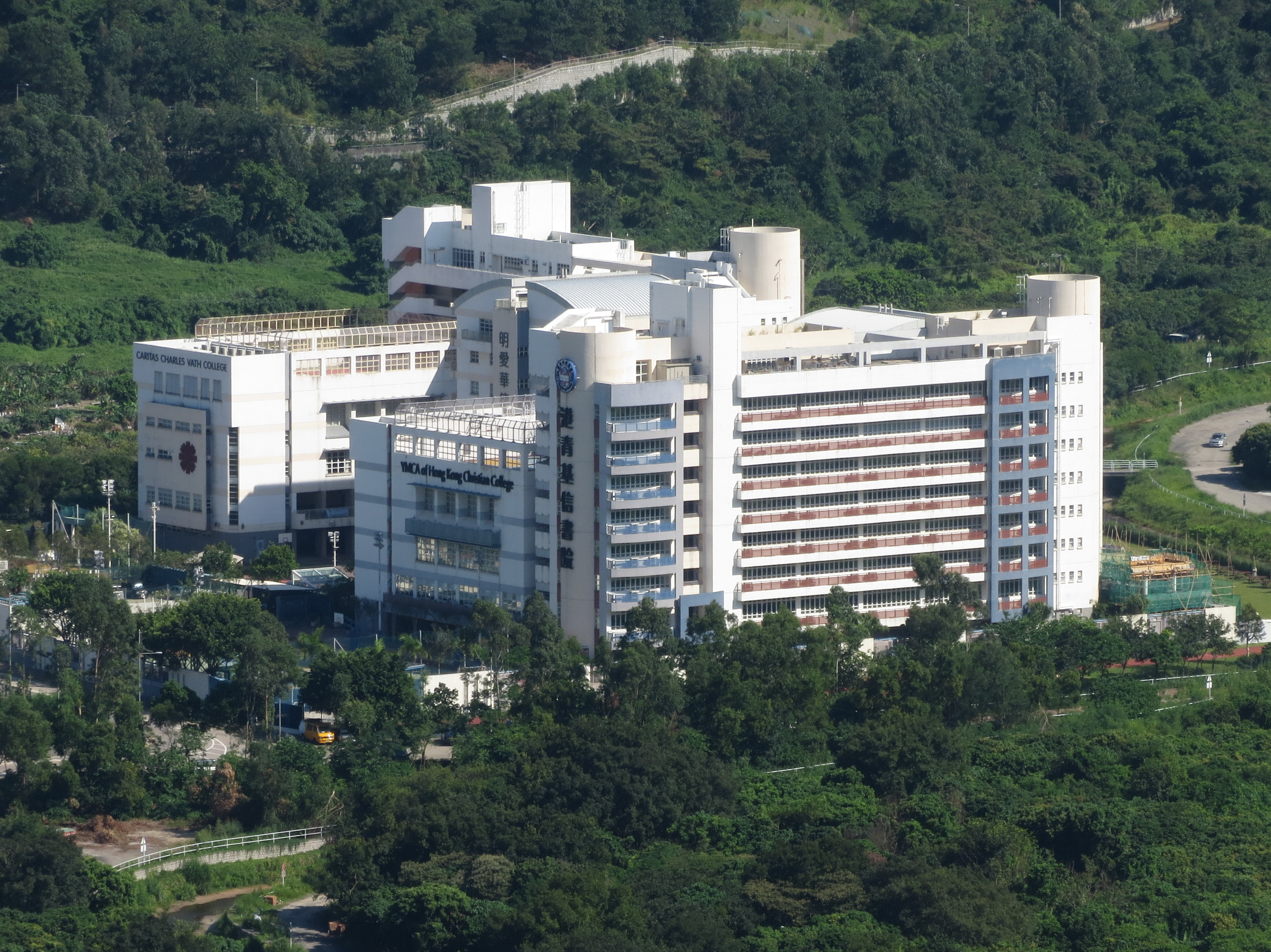
View of the school as seen from country park.

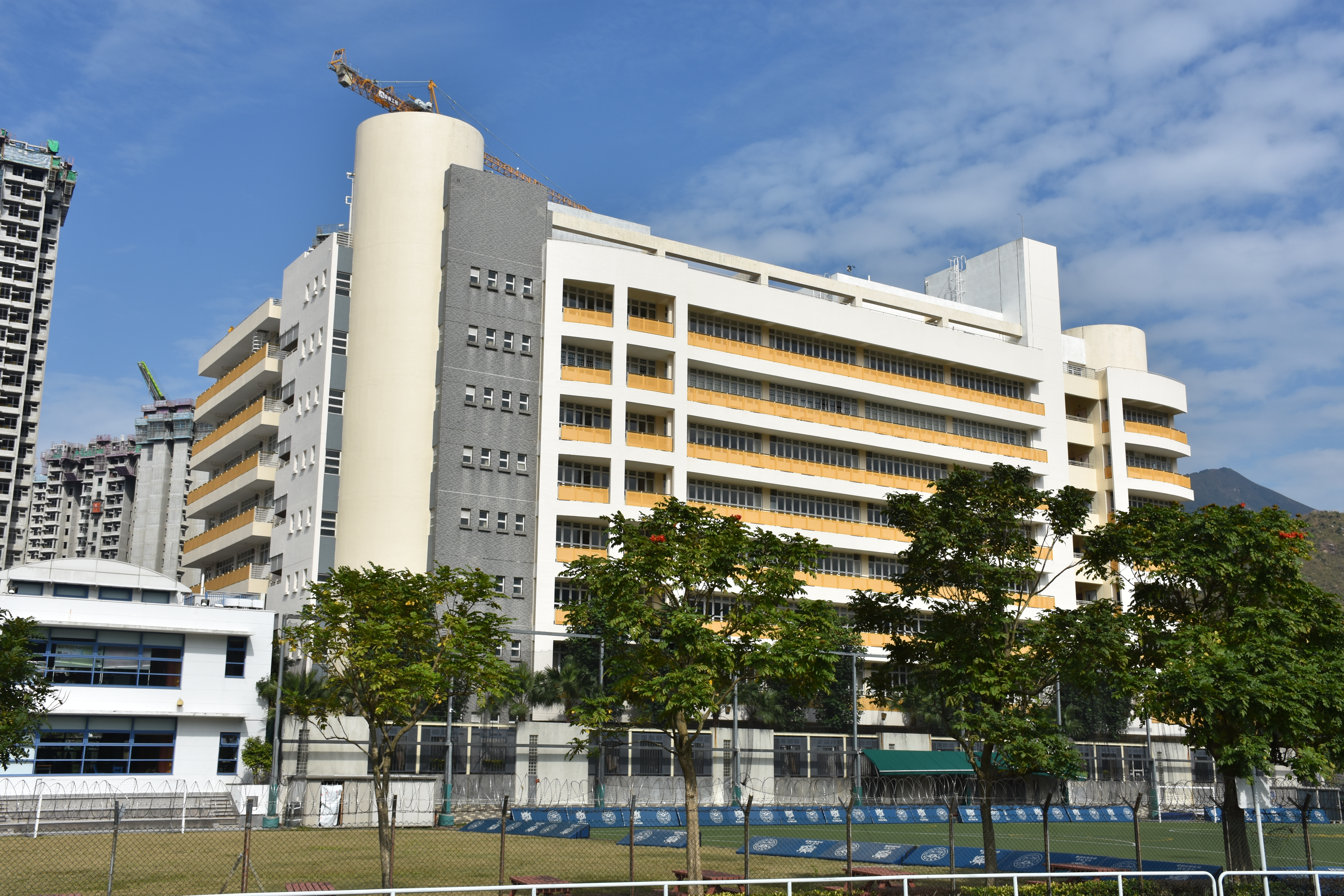
The rear side of the school, and a football pitch of YMCA of Hong Kong Christian College.

The school campus is located at North Lantau New Town in Tung Chung, Lantau Island. It is adjacent to Mun Tung Estate and YMCA of Hong Kong Christian College.

The school covers an area of about 7,600 square meters. There is an isolated greenhouse in the school campus.

In addition to the regular classrooms in the teaching building, the school was equipped with different recreation rooms such as a dancing room, an English corner, a studio and a chapel. Other special rooms include a Cosmetology room, an MMLC, an Art room, an Animation room and an interactive computer room etc.

== School characteristics ==
=== Practical school ===
The school offered Experience Based Learning certificate courses, i.e. experiential learning and work-based learning courses such as tourism, design, cosmetology, SOHO digital entertainment, performing arts, consumer electronics, tour guide, leadership, property management, fitness training, social services, web design, hotels and hospitality, women's quality management, manicure, hand-made ornaments, emerging sports, hand-made model skills, fluid dynamics and volunteering, etc.

== See also ==
- Caritas Hong Kong
- Education in Hong Kong
