= George Williams (philanthropist) =

English philanthropist and businessman (1821–1905)

Sir George Williams
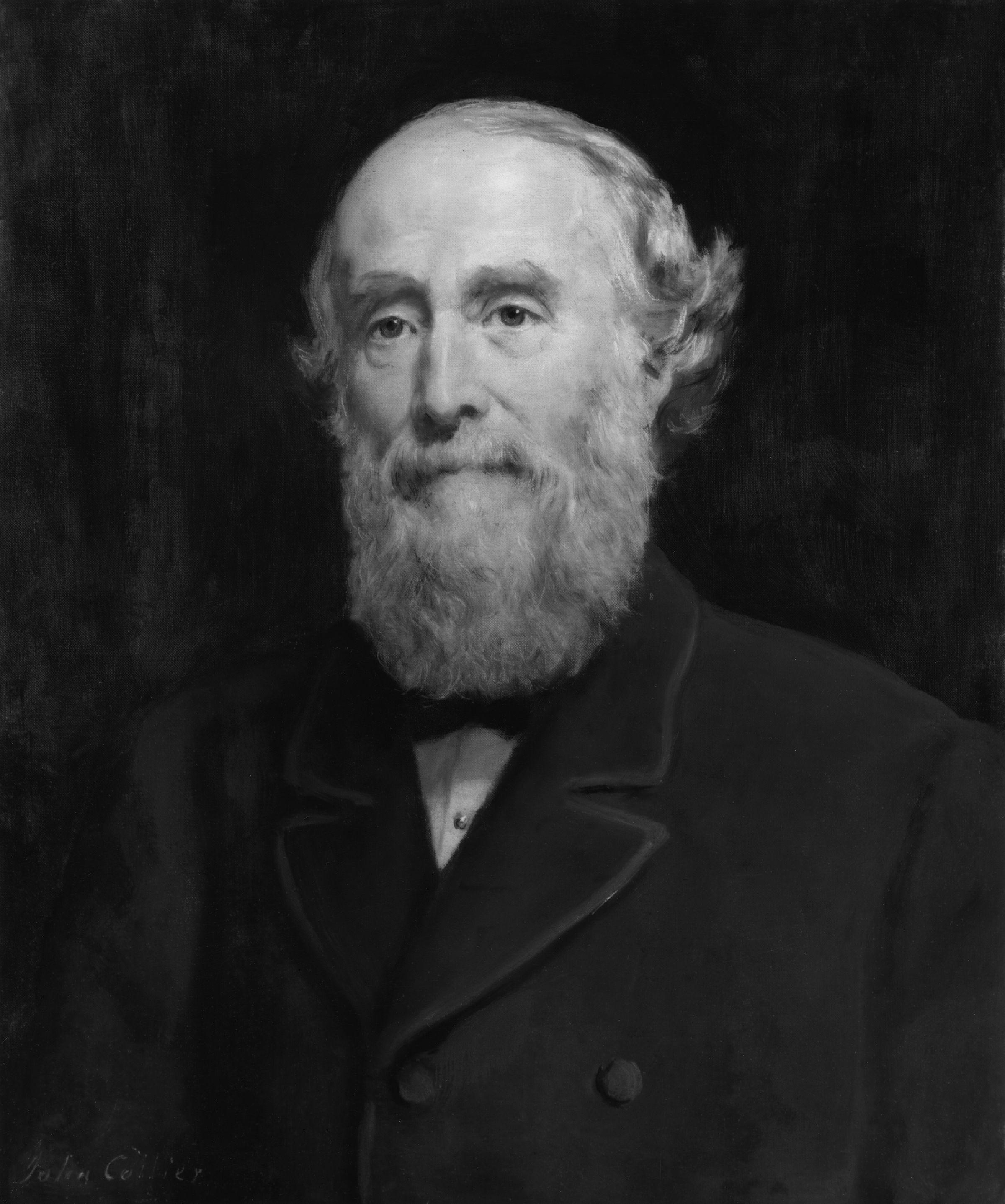
- Portrait by John Collier, originally in 1887
- Born: 11 October 1821; Dulverton, Somerset, England
- Died: 6 November 1905 (aged 84); London, England
- Resting place: St Paul's Cathedral
- Occupations: Philanthropist; businessman
- Organisation: YMCA
- Known for: Founding YMCA
- Spouse: Helen Jane Maunder Hitchcock (m. 1853)
- Children: 7

Signature
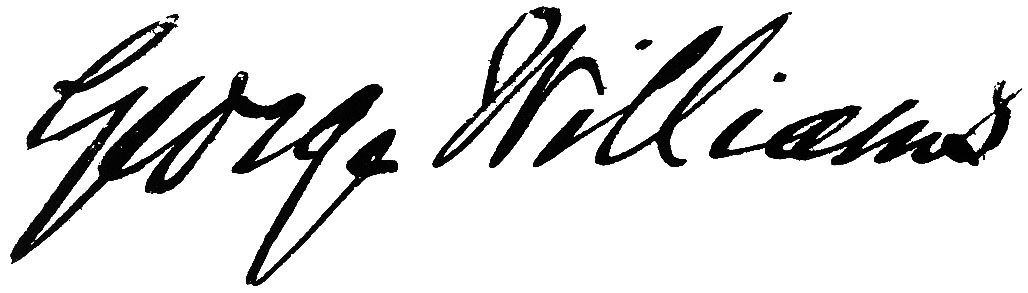

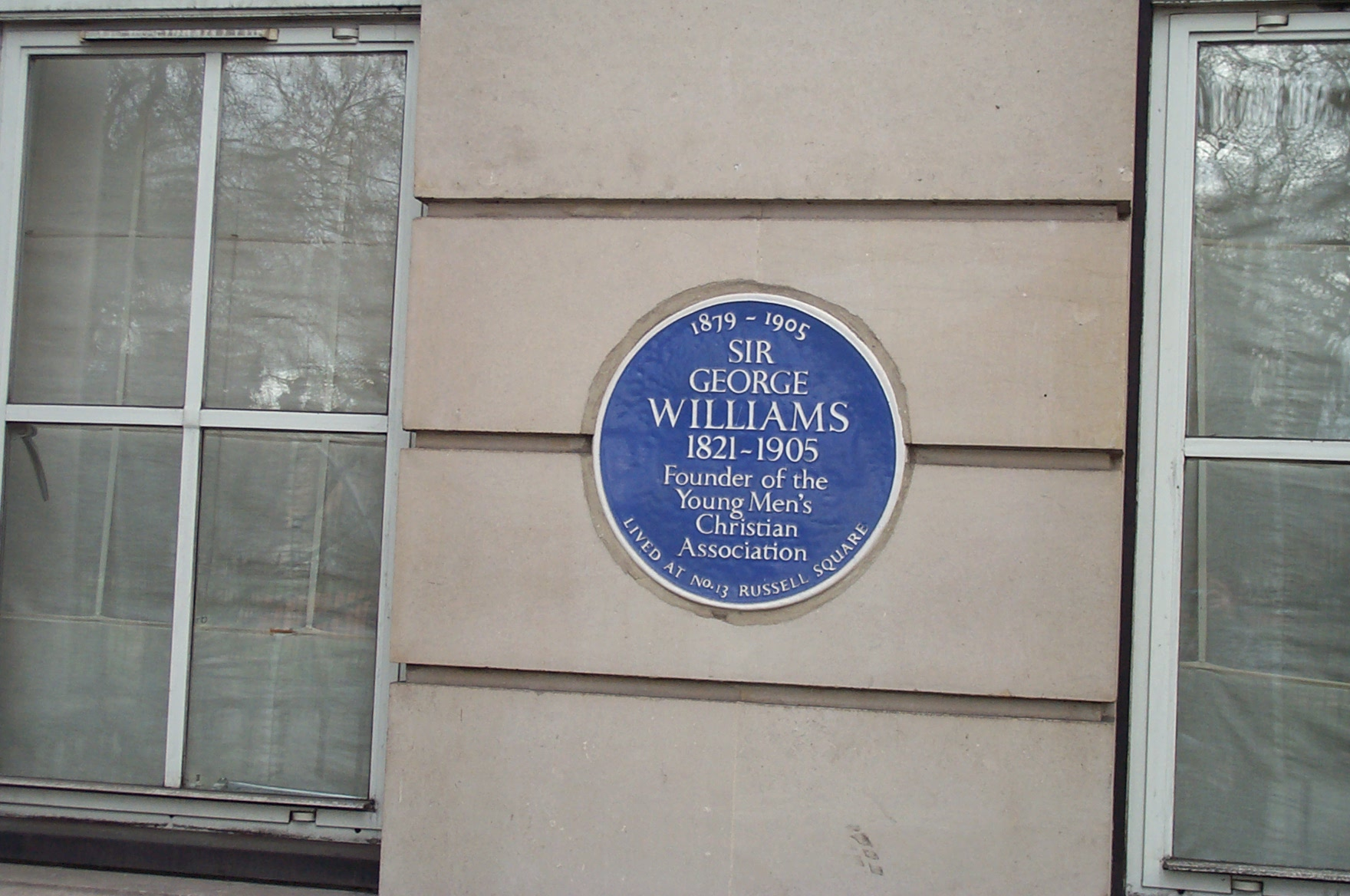
A plaque for George Williams 13-16 Russell Square, London.

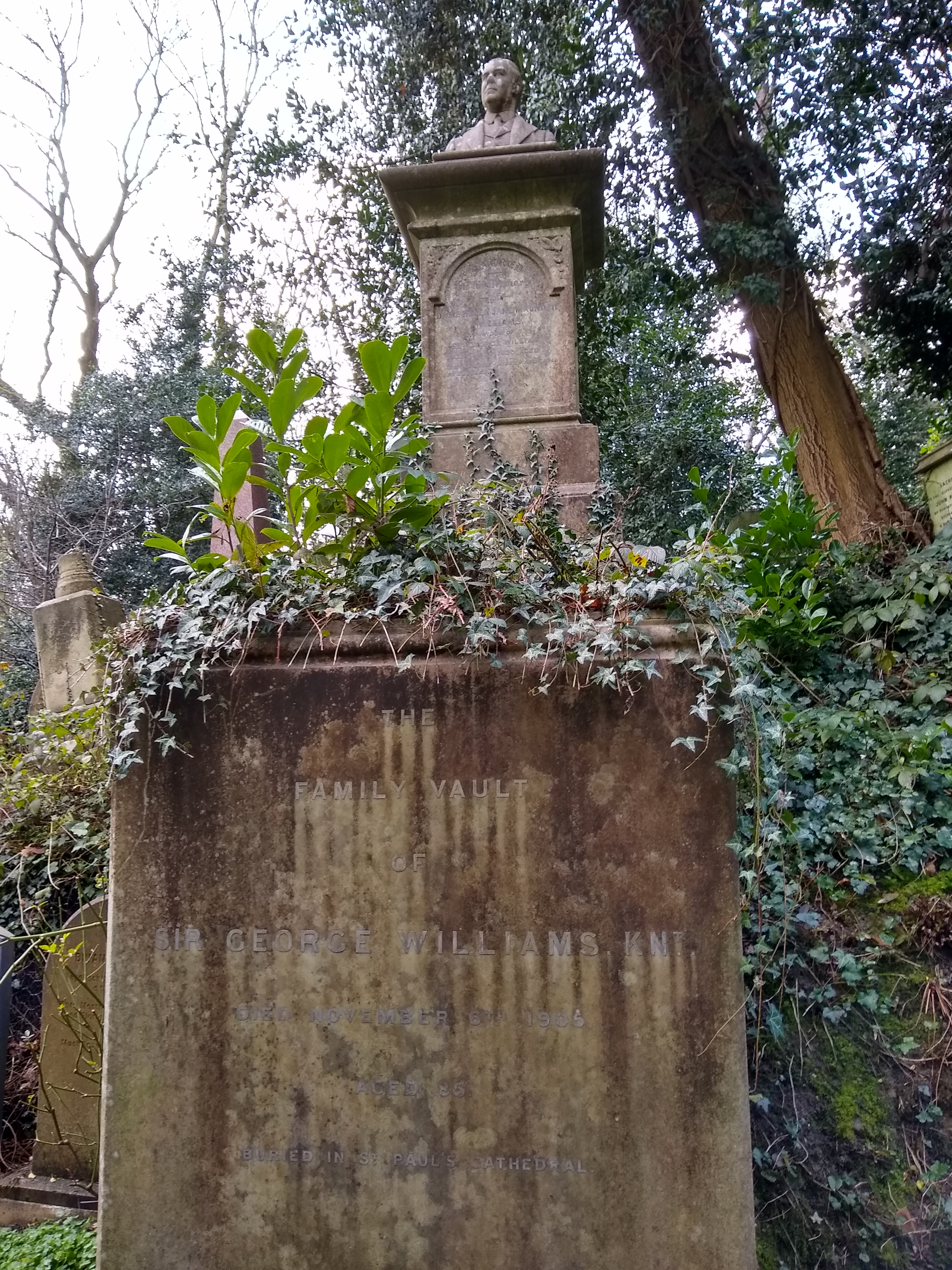
Family vault of Sir George Williams at Highgate Cemetery (west)

Sir George Williams (11 October 1821 – 6 November 1905) was an English philanthropist, businessman and founder of the Young Men's Christian Association (YMCA). The oldest and largest youth charity in the world, its aim is to support young people to belong, contribute and thrive in their communities.

Williams was knighted by Queen Victoria in her 1894 Birthday Honours. He died in 1905 and is buried in St Paul's Cathedral. He is a great-great-great-grandfather of Boris Johnson.

== Early life and education ==
Williams was born on a farm in Dulverton, Somerset, England, as the youngest of seven surviving sons of Amos Williams and Elizabeth Vickery. He was baptised into the Church of England. He came from several generations of farmers in Somerset, and attended Gloyn's in Tiverton, Devon until he was age 13, when he began working on his family farm. As a young man, he described himself as a "careless, thoughtless, godless, swearing young fellow". For unknown reasons, his family sent him to Bridgwater to be an apprentice at Henry William Holmes' draper shop. In 1837, Williams converted from Anglicanism to Congregationalism. He went to the Zion Congregational Church and became an involved member.

== Career ==
In 1841, he went to London and worked as an apprentice at Hitchcock & Rogers, a draper's shop, and became a member of the King's Weigh House Congregational Church, using his time for evangelisation. After three years, in 1844, Williams was promoted to department manager. He married the owner George Hitchcock's daughter, Helen Jane Maunder Hitchcock in 1853, and was taken into partnership at the drapers, renaming to George Hitchcock, Williams & Co. When Hitchcock died in 1863, Williams became the sole owner of the firm.

Hitchcock and Williams had seven children; his son Albert, a solicitor, would go on to marry the granddaughter of Thomas Cook. Williams's nephew John Williams married the only child of his lifelong London friend, Matthew Hodder, founder of British publisher Hodder & Stoughton.

In 1868, Williams offered to contribute towards the election expenses of Charles Reed. When Williams died on 6 November 1905 at the Victoria and Albert Hotel, Torquay, England, he was president for societies including Band of Hope, London City Mission, Railway Mission and YWCA.

His funeral took place at St Paul's Cathedral on 14 November 1905, with 2,600 people in attendance and is commemorated with a bust atop his family vault at Highgate Cemetery (west).

=== Founding of YMCA ===
Appalled by the terrible conditions in London for young working men, on 6 June 1844 Williams gathered a group of 11 fellow drapers in the living quarters of Hitchcock & Rogers to create a place that would not tempt young men into sin. They were James Smith (from W. D. Owen drapers), Christopher W. Smith, Norton Smith, Edward Valentine, Edward Beaumont, M. Glasson, William Creese, Francis John Crockett, E. Rogers, John Harvey and John Christian Symons.

The name, Young Men's Christian Association (YMCA), was settled on at the suggestion of Christopher W. Smith, a fellow draper at Hitchcock & Rogers. It promoted Muscular Christianity. One of the earliest converts and contributors to the new association was George's employer, George Hitchcock, who was the organisation's first treasurer.

== Honours ==
Williams was knighted by Queen Victoria in her 1894 Birthday Honours, YMCA's silver jubilee year, as well as receiving the Freedom of the City of London. After his death in 1905, he was commemorated by a stained-glass window in the nave of Westminster Abbey. Sir George Williams is buried in St Paul's Cathedral.

Sir George Williams University in Montreal, which was founded by YMCA, was named in commemoration of Williams; it was later merged into Concordia University, with its former campus retaining the name Sir George Williams Campus. George Williams College, located on the shores of Geneva Lake in Wisconsin, USA, is a satellite of Aurora University, and is also named after Williams.

Williams House in YMCA of Hong Kong Christian College, which was founded by YMCA of Hong Kong, was named in commemoration of Williams.

== Sources ==
- Binfield, Clyde. George Williams and the Y.M.C.A.: a Study in Victorian Social Attitudes 1973 London, Heinemann ISBN 0-434-07090-4
