= Mun Tung Estate =

Public housing estate in Tung Chung, Hong Kong

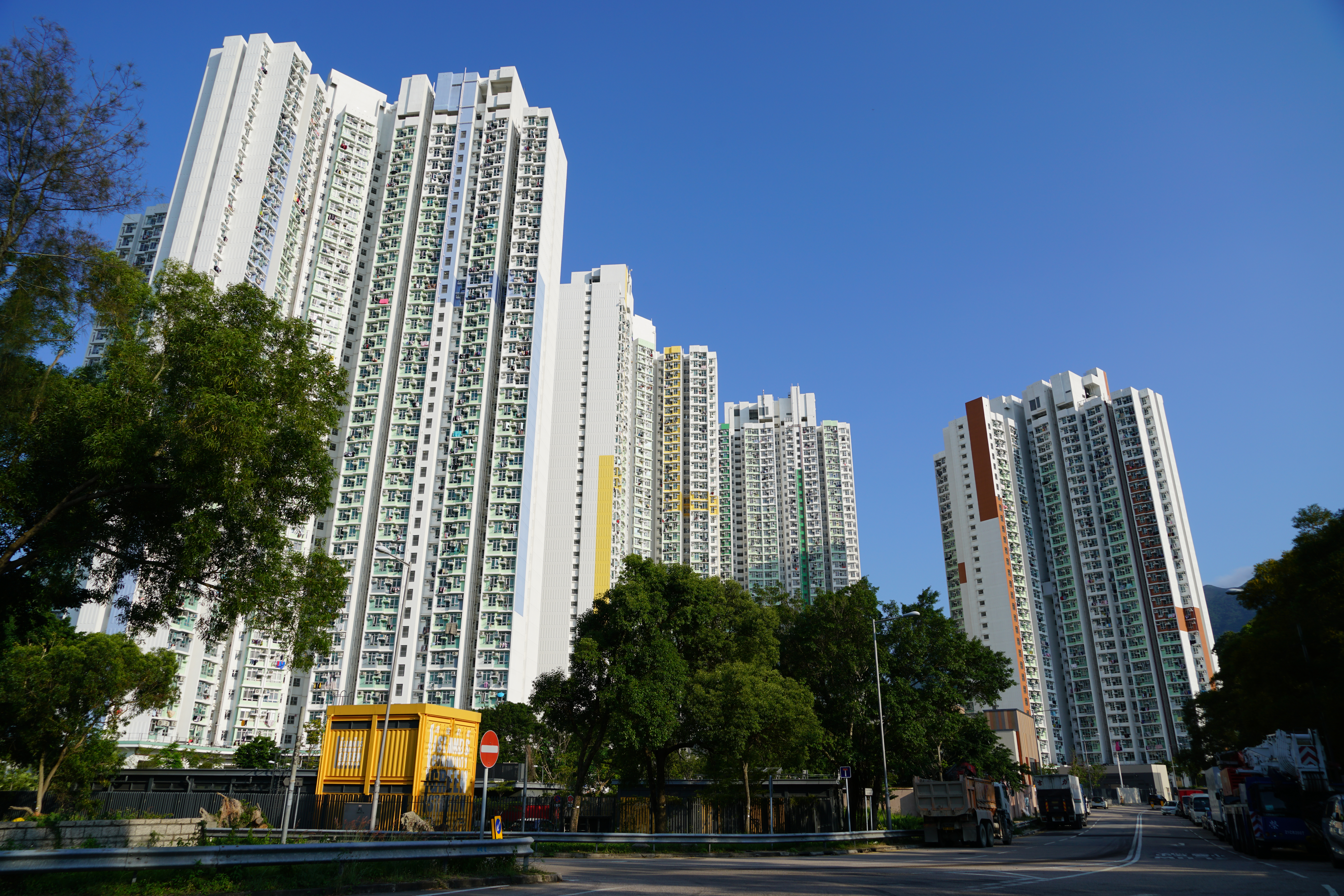
- Mun Tung Estate
- Interactive map of Mun Tung Estate

General information
- Location: 7 Chung Mun Road, Tung Chung; Lantau Island; New Territories, Hong Kong
- Coordinates: 22.2776413°N 113.932674°E
- Status: Completed
- Category: Public rental housing
- No. of blocks: 4
- No. of units: 3,866

Construction
- Constructed: 2018; 8 years ago
- Authority: Hong Kong Housing Authority

Mun Tung Estate (Chinese: 滿東邨) is a public housing estate in Tung Chung, Lantau Island, New Territories, Hong Kong near Yat Tung Estate, Hong Chi Shiu Pong Morninghope School, YMCA of Hong Kong Christian College, Caritas Charles Vath College and Tung Chung River. It consists of four residential buildings completed in 2018.

== Transportation ==
There are bus routes that can lead you to Tung Chung station, New Territories, etc.

=== Tung Chung Station bus routes ===
Bus routes such as 39M, 37H or 37 can lead you to Tung Chung Station.

=== Tin Hau bus routes ===
Bus routes such as E11B or E11S can lead you to Tin Hau station.

=== Ho Man Tin bus routes ===
Bus routes such as E21A or E21B can lead you to Oi Man Estate.

=== Hung Hom bus routes ===
Bus routes such as E21X can lead you to Hung Hom Station.

=== New Territories bus routes ===
Bus routes such as E31, E36A and N31 can lead you to Discovery Park (Hong Kong) and Yuen Long.

=== Airport bus routes ===
Bus routes such as S64X can lead you to Hong Kong International Airport.

=== Port bus routes ===
Bus routes such as B6 or B6S can lead you to Hong Kong-Zhuhai-Macau Bridge.

=== Tseung Kwan O bus routes ===
Bus routes such as E22S can lead you to Po Lam Station

== Houses ==
Name	Chinese name	Building type	Completed
Mun Wo House	滿和樓	Non-standard	2018
Mun Shun House	滿順樓	Non-standard	2018
Mun Hong House	滿康樓	Non-standard	2018
Mun Tai House	滿泰樓	Non-standard	2018

== Politics ==
Mun Tung Estate is located in Mun Yat constituency of the Islands District Council. It is currently represented by Eric Kwok Ping, who was elected in the 2019 elections.

== COVID-19 pandemic ==
Mun Wo House of the estate was in lockdown for mandatory test between 16-18 February 2022.

== See also ==
- Public housing estates on Lantau Island
