= Canossa Hospital =

Canossa Hospital (Caritas)
- Caritas Hong Kong

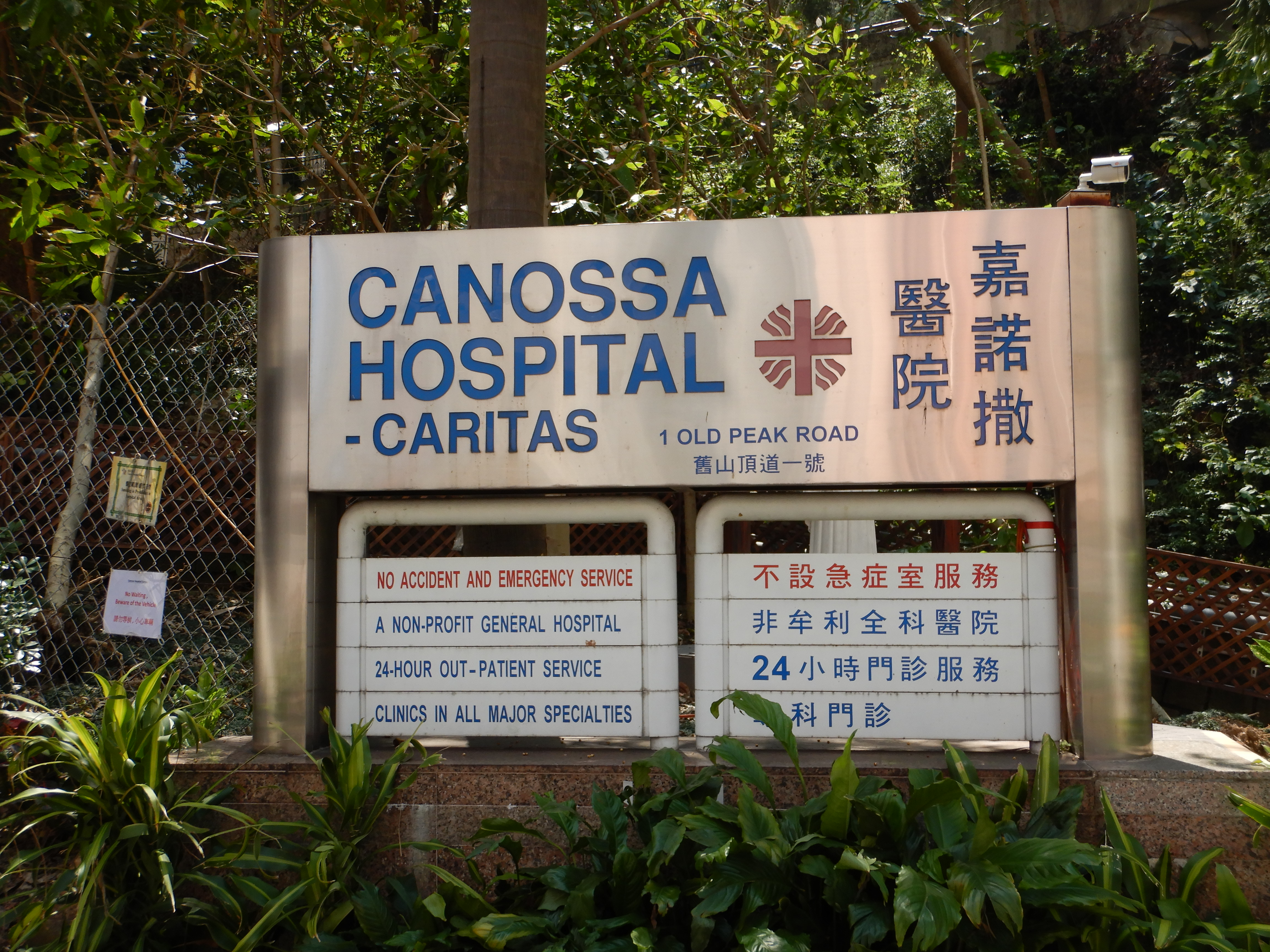
- Sign of Canossa Hospital

- Location within Hong Kong

Geography
- Location: 1 Old Peak Road, Mid-Levels, Hong Kong Island, Hong Kong
- Coordinates: 22°16′38″N 114°09′14″E

Organisation
- Care system: Community
- Patron: Canossian Daughters of Charity

Services
- Emergency department: No Accident & Emergency
- Beds: 174

Helipads
- Helipad: No

History
- Founded: 1929; 97 years ago

Links
- Website: www.canossahospital.org.hk
- Lists: Hospitals in Hong Kong

Canossa Hospital (Caritas) (Chinese: 嘉諾撒醫院) is a private Catholic community hospital in Hong Kong.

== Overview and history ==
Canossa Hospital was founded by the Canossian Daughters of Charity in 1929. The original building with 16 beds was destroyed during World War II. The present building was opened in 1960. It is an acute non-profit general hospital with 146 beds at the Mid-levels. A new extension was opened in 2014 and the old building is now under major renovation floor by floor.

The management of Canossa Hospital was passed on to Caritas Hong Kong in June 1991. The name of the Hospital was subsequently changed to Canossa Hospital (Caritas). The joint forces aim at rendering quality holistic health care services to the people of Hong Kong, a service which aims to continue the Mission of St. Magdalene of Canossa, the founder of the Canossian Sisters, for the sick and the less fortunate.

== Accreditation ==
Canossa Hospital is a member of Hong Kong Private Hospitals Association. Canossa is surveyed and accredited bi-annually by QHA Trent Accreditation of the United Kingdom, a major international healthcare accreditation group. In 2011, Canossa Hospital was accredited by the ACHS (Australian Council on Healthcare Standards). Canossa Hospital had gone through the period review in 2013 and will be undergoing the next cycle of ACHS accreditation in June 2015.

== See also ==
- List of hospitals in Hong Kong
