= Experience Based Learning =

Experience Based Learning, Inc.
- Type: Private
- Founded: 1993
- Founder: Steve Gustafson
- Headquarters: Rockford, Illinois, USA
- Key people: Steve Gustafson, President & CEO
- Products: Zip-line tours and installation
- Website: www.ebl.org

Experience Based Learning, also known as EBL, is an Illinois-based zip line tour and installation company founded in 1996 by Steve Gustafson. Gustafson cofounded the Professional Ropes Course Association (PRCA) in order to maintain insurance coverage for EBL in 2003 and served on the board of directors for the standards developer for zip-lines, as its president until 2015.

== History ==
EBL was founded in 1996 by owner Steve Gustafson. He obtained his degrees in Recreation, Parks and Tourism and Geology from Western Illinois University. Gustafson has been participating, operating and building ropes challenge course, zip-lines and zip-line courses since 1986. He is considered by some to be the founder of the modern day zipline. EBL installed the first commercially promoted zip line tour with cables in the United States, alongside the client installing their own platforms, and has erected numerous courses since. The first went up in 2002 in Hawai'i. Part of the concept for the touring originated in Costa Rica, as an Ecotourism adventure.

== Operations ==
EBL has installed zip-line courses at numerous locations throughout the US and also has installations in South Korea and Canada. In 2014 EBL opened a zip-line in its founder's home town of Rockford, Illinois. EBL, along with other zipline operators, has called for stricter self-policing in the light of numerous deaths from other zip-line courses.
