= Indoor hockey at the 2019 SEA Games – Women's tournament =

Women's indoor hockey at the 2019 SEA Games
Tournament details
- Host country: Philippines
- City: Los Baños
- Dates: 4–10 December
- Teams: 5 (from 1 confederation)
- Venue: Centro Mall

Final positions
- Champions: Malaysia (1st title)
- Runner-up: Thailand

Tournament statistics
- Matches played: 13
- Goals scored: 90 (6.92 per match)
- Top scorer: (Thailand) Tikhamporn Sakulpithak (9 goals)

The women's team tournament for indoor hockey at the 2019 SEA Games in Philippines were held from 4 to 10 December 2019 at LB Centro Mall & Convention Center.

== Squads ==
Malaysia (MAS)	Cambodia (CAM)	Philippines (PHI)	Singapore (SGP)	Thailand (THA)
Farah Ayuni Yahya; Juliana Mohamad Din; Qasidah Najwa Muhammad Halimi; Noor Hasliza Md Ali; Ellya Shahirah Ellias; Nur Aisyah Yaacob; Siti Rozailah Syuhada Jilon; Iren Hussin; Nur Afiqah Syahzani Azhar; Raja Norsharina Raja Shabuddin; Nuraini Abdul Rashid; Wan Norfaiezah Saiuti	Ta Mam; Swati Sreng; Kumari Seng; Saini Ny; Nisha Ya; Vita Sa; Chanpheary Sam; Sovanphearum Chheoung; Lina Theib; Ry Heng; Nika Kong; Srey Sros Eng	Maria Paulyn Castillo; Andrea Maria Lagman; Paula Jean Dumaplin; Jevilyn Obasa; Denizelle Ann Rasing; Yarra Austine Sebastian; Morticia Blair Castro; Angela Thea Laraya; Jaylene May Lumbo; Yvonne Mae Tasis; Kyle Delos Santos; Rafaela Landicho	Chen Jingyi; Hannah Tan Ismail; Rahimah Abdul Aziz; Nadia Binte Ibrahim; Joan Anne Lim Ooi Hong; Sinuan Wannelenah Bte Mohd Alvarez; Janna Lim Ju Hong; Suriati Sonny; Juliette Lim Chor Hong; O Ming Fen; Natasha Venise Gerard; Lam Xin Ni	Boonta Duangurai; Chantree Ladawon; Sairung Juwong; Jiratchaya Todkaew; Benjamas Bureewan; Tikhamporn Sakulpithak; Supansa Samanso; Priyakorn Jomjan; Anongnat Piresram; Alisa Narueangram; Kittiya Losantia

== Results ==
=== Group stage ===
Pos	Team	Pld	W	D	L	GF	GA	GD	Pts	Qualification
1	Malaysia	4	3	1	0	30	2	+28	10	Semi-finals
2	Thailand	4	3	1	0	23	3	+20	10	Semi-finals
3	Singapore	4	1	1	2	4	16	−12	4	Semi-finals
4	Philippines (H)	4	1	0	3	4	24	−20	3	Semi-finals
5	Cambodia	4	0	1	3	7	23	−16	1	

Source: FIH
(H) Hosts

4 December 2019
16:00

Cambodia	3–3	Singapore
	Report

Umpires:
Kamile Mockaityte (LTU)
Kristine Santos (PHI)

4 December 2019
19:30

Malaysia	15–0	Philippines
	Report

Umpires:
Ornpimol Kittiteerasopon (THA)
Puthearim Chhoueng (CAM)

5 December 2019
14:15

Malaysia	3–0	Singapore
	Report

Umpires:
Anastasia Bogolyubova (RUS)
Kamile Mockaityte (LTU)

5 December 2019
17:45

Thailand	5–0	Philippines
	Report

Umpires:
Nur Hafizah Azman (MAS)
Felissa Lai (SGP)

6 December 2019
14:15

Cambodia	1–6	Thailand
	Report

Umpires:
Anastasia Bogolyubova (RUS)
Felissa Lai (SGP)

6 December 2019
17:45

Singapore	1–0	Philippines
	Report

Umpires:
Ornpimol Kittiteerasopon (THA)
Nur Hafizah Azman (MAS)

7 December 2019
16:00

Malaysia	2–2	Thailand
	Report

Umpires:
Anastasia Bogolyubova (RUS)
Kamile Mockaityte (LTU)

7 December 2019
19:30

Philippines	4–3	Cambodia
	Report

Umpires:
Nur Hafizah Azman (MAS)
Ornpimol Kittiteerasopon (THA)

8 December 2019
14:15

Thailand	10–0	Singapore
	Report

Umpires:
Nur Hafizah Azman (MAS)
Kamile Mockaityte (LTU)

8 December 2019
17:45

Cambodia	0–10	Malaysia
	Report

Umpires:
Ornpimol Kittiteerasopon (THA)
Kristine Santos (PHI)

=== Medal round ===
Semi-finals
9 December
Thailand	4
Singapore	0
9 December
Malaysia	16
Philippines	0

Final
10 December
Thailand	1 (0)
Malaysia (s.o.)	1 (2)

==== Semi-finals ====
9 December 2019
13:30

Thailand	4–0	Singapore
	Report

Umpires:
Nur Hafizah Azman (MAS)
Anastasia Bogolyubova (RUS)

9 December 2019
19:30

Malaysia	16–0	Philippines
	Report

Umpires:
Ornpimol Kittiteerasopon (THA)
Felissa Lai (SGP)

==== Final ====
10 December 2019
17:30

Thailand	1–1	Malaysia
	Report
Penalties
	0–2

Umpires:
Anastasia Bogolyubova (RUS)
Kamile Mockaityte (LTU)

== Final standings ==
Rank	Team
1st place, gold medalist(s)	Malaysia
2nd place, silver medalist(s)	Thailand
3rd place, bronze medalist(s)	Philippines
3rd place, bronze medalist(s)	Singapore
5	Cambodia

== See also ==
- Indoor hockey at the 2019 SEA Games – Men's tournament
