= Caritas Hong Kong =

Catholic charity in Hong Kong

- 香港明愛
- Established: July 1953; 72 years ago
- Founder: Roman Catholic Diocese of Hong Kong
- Type: Nonprofit
- Headquarters: Caritas House, 2 Caine Road
- Location: Hong Kong, China
- Coordinates: 22.2793°N 114.1541°E
- Region served: Hong Kong
- Services: social work services, education, medical care, community development and hospitality
- President: Cardinal Stephen Chow
- Affiliations: Caritas Internationalis, Caritas Asia
- Expenses: HK$2,985,097,000 (2022/2023)
- Staff: 8,421 (2023)
- Volunteers: 12,000 (2023)
- Website: www.caritas.org.hk

Chinese name
- Traditional Chinese: 香港明愛
- Simplified Chinese: 香港明爱
- Literal meaning: Hong Kong Bright Love
Transcriptions
Standard Mandarin
- Hanyu Pinyin: Xiānggǎng Míngài
Yue: Cantonese
- Yale Romanization: Hēung góng mìhng oi
- Jyutping: Hoeng1 gong2 ming4 oi3

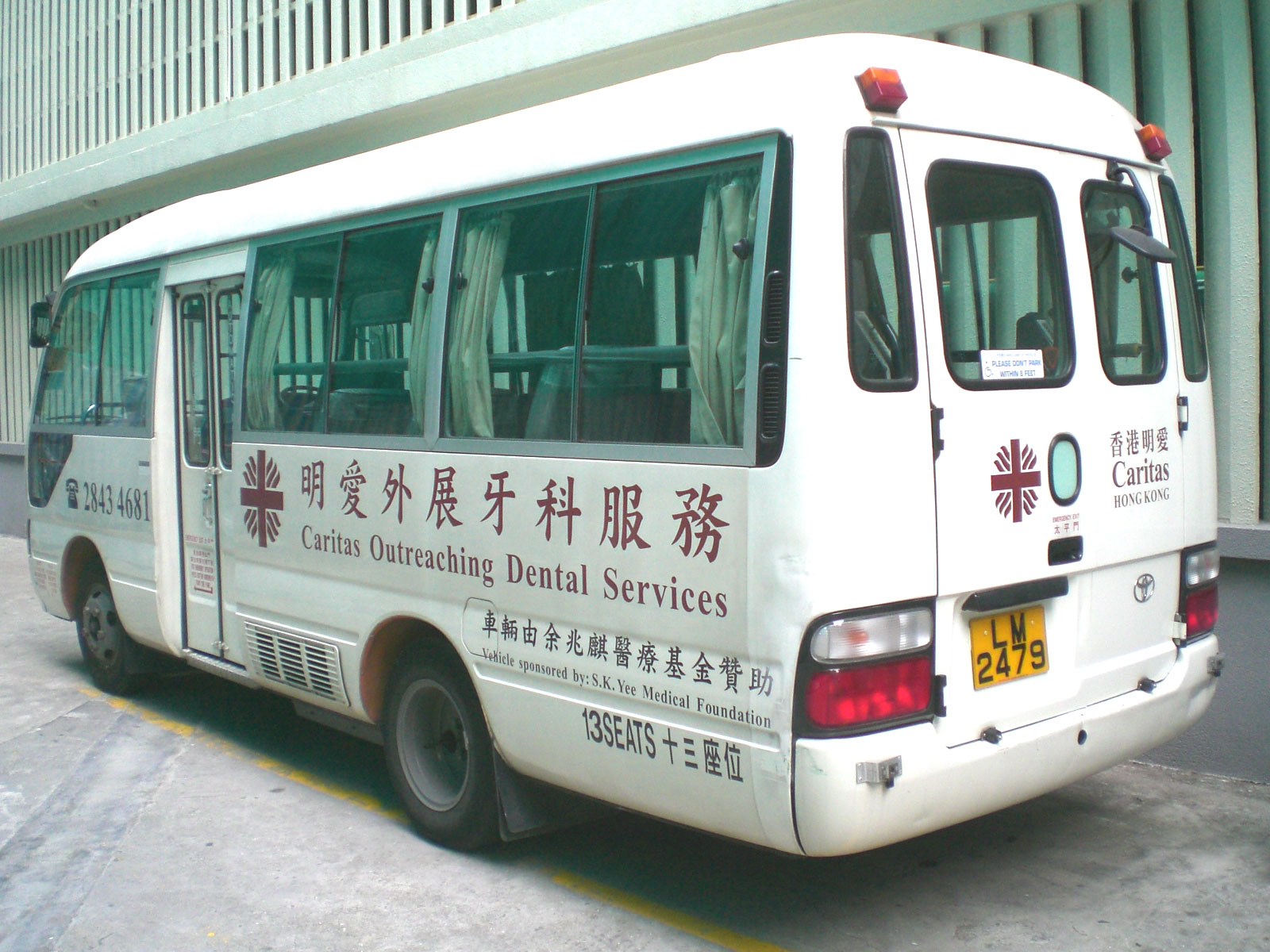
A Caritas Hong Kong Outreaching Dental Services bus

Caritas Hong Kong is a charitable organisation, a member of Caritas Internationalis, founded by the Catholic Diocese of Hong Kong in July 1953. It started with relief and rehabilitation services to the poor and the distressed after the Second World War. It has been expanded to involve social services, education services, medical services, hospitality services and many others. It is led by Board of Management chairman Dominic Chan.

It is funded by the Hong Kong Government, Community Chest, as well as other donations and participant fees.

== Hospitals ==
- Public:
  - Caritas Medical Centre, founded in 1964
- Private
  - Precious Blood Hospital (Caritas), taken up in 1993
  - Canossa Hospital (Caritas), taken up in 1991

== Schools ==
=== Special Education & Vocational Training Service ===
- Caritas Lok Jun School
- Caritas Lok Yi School
- Caritas Lok Kan School
- Caritas Resurrection School
- Caritas Magdalene School
- Caritas Jockey Club Lok Yan School

=== Vocational Training & Education Service ===
==== Caritas Secondary School ====
- Caritas St. Francis Secondary School
- Caritas Chong Yuet Ming Secondary School
- Caritas St. Joseph Secondary School
- Caritas St. Paul Secondary School
- Caritas Tuen Mun Marden Foundation Secondary School
- Caritas Chai Wan Marden Foundation Secondary School
- Caritas Shatin Marden Foundation Secondary School
- Caritas Fanling Chan Chun Ha Secondary School
- Caritas Yuen Long Chan Chun Ha Secondary School
- Caritas Ma On Shan Secondary School
- Caritas Charles Vath College

=== Adult and Higher Education Service ===
- Caritas Institute of Higher Education (formerly Caritas Francis Hsu College)
- Caritas Bianchi College of Careers (Day and Night School)
- Caritas Institute of Community Education
- Caritas St. Joseph's Institute For Further and Adult Education- Night School
- Centre For Advanced & Professional Studies
- Caritas Cosmetic Career Centre
- Caritas Adult & Higher Education Service – City Centre
- Education & Retraining Information Network For New Arrivals
- Caritas Information Technology Advancement Centre
- Caritas Human Resources Investment Section
- Caritas Logistics Centre

== Environmental Protection Initiative ==
- Hong Kong Caritas Computer Recycle Project

== See also ==
- List of non-governmental organizations in the People's Republic of China
