= Malaysia at the 2023 SEA Games =

Malaysia at the 2023 Southeast Asian Games
- IOC code: MAS
- NOC: Olympic Council of Malaysia
- Website: www.olympic.org.my (in English)

in Phnom Penh, Cambodia
- Competitors: 677
- Flag bearer: Sharmendran Raghonathan (karate)
- Officials: 237
- Medals Ranked 7th: Gold 34 Silver 45 Bronze 96 Total 175

Southeast Asian Games appearances (overview)
- 1959; 1961; 1965; 1967; 1969; 1971; 1973; 1975; 1977; 1979; 1981; 1983; 1985; 1987; 1989; 1991; 1993; 1995; 1997; 1999; 2001; 2003; 2005; 2007; 2009; 2011; 2013; 2015; 2017; 2019; 2021; 2023; 2025; 2027; 2029

Malaysia participated at the 2023 Southeast Asian Games in Phnom Penh, Cambodia from 5 to 17 May 2023. The Malaysian contingent consisted of 677 athletes, 403 being men and 274 women - competing in 33 sports. The contingent also included 237 officials.

== Background ==
=== Preparations ===
The third Olympic Council of Malaysia (OCM) executive board meeting for the 2021/ 2025 session on 11 January 2023 has agreed to appoint OCM assistant treasurer Datuk Mohd Nasir Ali as the chef de mission (CDM) for the 32nd SEA Games in Cambodia. On 17 February, OCM appointed bowling legend Datuk Shalin Zulkifli and former squash champion Sharon Wee as the deputy CDM.

On 27 April 2023, it was announced that karate exponent, Sharmendran Raghonathan will be the flag bearer at the Opening Ceremony. In a statement, OCM president Tan Sri Mohamad Norza Zakaria said after reviewing the list that included seven other nominees, Sharmendran was selected based on his medal prospects and experience. Sharmendran now becomes the second karate athlete to be the Jalur Gemilang flag bearer at the SEA Games, after Puvaneswaran Ramasamy in Hanoi at the 2003 Southeast Asian Games.

During the flag handover ceremony at Bukit Jalil, Kuala Lumpur on 30 April 2023, Malaysian Youth and Sports Minister Hannah Yeoh announced the 141-medal target for the delegation, which consists of 40 gold, 37 silver and 64 bronze medals. Several factors were taken into consideration when setting the target, such as the lack of events which the national delegation is capable of winning medals, and several engagement sessions as well as latest data on the capabilities of athletes from other competing countries.

=== Broadcasters ===
| Name | Type | Ref |
|---|---|---|
| RTM | Free-to-air and over-the-top | |

== Medal summary ==
=== Medal by sport ===
Medals by sport
| Sport | 1st place, gold medalist(s) | 2nd place, silver medalist(s) | 3rd place, bronze medalist(s) | Total | Rank |
|---|---|---|---|---|---|
| Aquatics—Diving | 4 | 2 | 1 | 7 | (1) |
| Aquatics—Swimming | 1 | 3 | 4 | 8 | (6) |
| Athletics | 5 | 3 | 11 | 19 | (4) |
| Badminton | 0 | 2 | 4 | 6 | (4) |
| Basketball | 0 | 0 | 1 | 1 | (5) |
| Billiards Sport | 2 | 2 | 2 | 6 | (3) |
| Boxing | 0 | 0 | 3 | 3 | (8) |
| Chess—Xiangqi | 0 | 1 | 2 | 3 | (3) |
| Cricket | 0 | 3 | 3 | 6 | (5) |
| Cycling — Mountain Bike | 0 | 1 | 0 | 1 | (4) |
| Cycling — Road | 1 | 1 | 2 | 4 | (1) |
| Dancesport | 1 | 0 | 0 | 1 | (2) |
| E-Sports | 0 | 2 | 2 | 4 | (6) |
| Fencing | 0 | 0 | 4 | 4 | (5) |
| Field Hockey | 2 | 0 | 0 | 2 | (1) |
| Finswimming | 0 | 0 | 1 | 1 | (6) |
| Floorball | 0 | 0 | 2 | 2 | (4) |
| Golf | 1 | 1 | 2 | 4 | (2) |
| Gymnastics—Artistic | 0 | 0 | 5 | 5 | (7) |
| Indoor Hockey | 0 | 2 | 0 | 2 | (3) |
| Judo | 0 | 0 | 2 | 2 | (9) |
| Ju-jitsu | 0 | 0 | 1 | 1 | (7) |
| Karate | 4 | 2 | 4 | 10 | (2) |
| Kickboxing | 1 | 0 | 1 | 2 | (5) |
| Kun Khmer | 0 | 0 | 5 | 5 | (6) |
| Obstacle Race | 0 | 1 | 3 | 4 | (2) |
| Pencak Silat | 4 | 5 | 4 | 13 | (2) |
| Pétanque | 1 | 1 | 3 | 5 | (3) |
| Sailing | 2 | 1 | 4 | 7 | (3) |
| Sepak Takraw & Chinlone | 0 | 4 | 4 | 8 | (7) |
| Table Tennis | 0 | 3 | 2 | 5 | (4) |
| Taekwondo | 3 | 2 | 3 | 8 | (4) |
| Tennis | 0 | 0 | 2 | 2 | (6) |
| Traditional Boat Race | 0 | 1 | 2 | 3 | (6) |
| Weightlifting | 0 | 0 | 1 | 1 | (8) |
| Wushu | 2 | 2 | 6 | 10 | (4) |
| Total | 34 | 45 | 96 | 175 | (7) |

=== Medal by date ===
Medals by date
| Day | Date | 1st place, gold medalist(s) | 2nd place, silver medalist(s) | 3rd place, bronze medalist(s) | Total |
|---|---|---|---|---|---|
| 1 | 6 May | 2 | 2 | 7 | 11 |
| 2 | 7 May | 4 | 8 | 6 | 18 |
| 3 | 8 May | 4 | 3 | 12 | 19 |
| 4 | 9 May | 5 | 2 | 8 | 15 |
| 5 | 10 May | 6 | 7 | 11 | 24 |
| 6 | 11 May | 3 | 9 | 9 | 21 |
| 7 | 12 May | 4 | 4 | 11 | 19 |
| 8 | 13 May | 0 | 2 | 9 | 11 |
| 9 | 14 May | 1 | 4 | 6 | 11 |
| 10 | 15 May | 1 | 1 | 10 | 12 |
| 11 | 16 May | 4 | 3 | 7 | 14 |
| Total | | 34 | 45 | 96 | 175 |

=== Medalists ===
| Medal | Name | Sport | Event | Date |
|---|---|---|---|---|
| Gold | Prem Kumar Selvam | Karate | Men's kumite (-55 kg) | 6 May |
| Gold | Shahmalarani Chandran | Karate | Women's kumite (-50 kg) | 6 May |
| Gold | Sureeya Sankar Hari Sankar | Karate | Men's kumite (-60 kg) | 7 May |
| Gold | Sharmendran Raghonathan | Karate | Men's kumite (-75 kg) | 7 May |
| Gold | Muhammad Danial Azray Noorazizan; Muhammad Danial Azrol Noorazizan | Pencak Silat | Men's seni ganda | 7 May |
| Gold | Saiful Bahri Musmin | Pétanque | Men's singles | 7 May |
| Gold | Kimberly Bong Qian Ping | Aquatics — Diving | Women's 3m springboard | 8 May |
| Gold | Wong Grace Xiu Mei | Athletics | Women's hammer throw | 8 May |
| Gold | Izry Hafiezy Fitry Azri | Sailing | Men's windsurfing RS:One | 8 May |
| Gold | Muhammad Hafizin Mansor | Sailing | Men's windsurfing RS:X | 8 May |
| Gold | Muhammad Syafiq Puteh | Aquatics — Diving | Men's 3m springboard | 9 May |
| Gold | Khiew Hoe Yean | Aquatics — Swimming | Men's 200m freestyle | 9 May |
| Gold | Umar Osman | Athletics | Men's 400m | 9 May |
| Gold | Shereen Samson Vallabouy | Athletics | Women's 400m | 9 May |
| Gold | Moh Keen Hoo | Billiards Sport | Men's snooker 6-red singles | 9 May |
| Gold | Lee Yiat Qing | Aquatics — Diving | Women's 10m platform | 10 May |
| Gold | Ng Jing Xuen | Golf | Women's individual | 10 May |
| Gold | Muhammad Izzul Irfan Marzuki | Pencak Silat | Men's tanding class D(-65 kg) | 10 May |
| Gold | Norsyakirah Muksin | Pencak Silat | Women's tanding class U45(<45 kg) | 10 May |
| Gold | Nor Farah Mazlan | Pencak Silat | Women's tanding class A(-50 kg) | 10 May |
| Gold | Tan Cheong Min | Wushu | Women's taolu nanquan | 10 May |
| Gold | Enrique Maccartney Harold | Aquatics — Diving | Men's 10m platform | 11 May |
| Gold | Andre Anura | Athletics | Men's triple jump | 11 May |
| Gold | Muhammad Irfan Shamshuddin | Athletics | Men's discus throw | 11 May |
| Gold | Nur Amirull Fakhruddin Mazuki | Cycling — Road | Men's mass start Individual | 12 May |
| Gold | Nur Humaira Abdul Karim | Taekwondo | Women's Recognized Poomsae Individual | 12 May |
| Gold | Jason Loo Jun Wei; Nurul Hidayah Abdul Karim | Taekwondo | Mixed Recognized Poomsae Pair | 12 May |
| Gold | Tan Cheong Min | Wushu | Women's taolu Nandao + Nangun | 12 May |
| Gold | Thor Chuan Leong | Billiards Sport | Men's snooker singles | 14 May |
| Gold | Muhammad Syafiq Zuber | Taekwondo | Men's Kyorugi — Welterweight (80 kg) | 15 May |
| Gold | Sam Jee Lek (Lego Sam) | Dancesport | Men's Breakdance | 16 May |
| Gold | Siti Zalia Nasir; Nuraini Abdul Rashid; Nur Insyirah Effarizal; Dayang Nuramirah Abang; Azhari Azmyra; Juliani Mohamad Din; Siti Nur Arfah Mohd Nor; Nur Afiqah Syahzani Azhar; Mashitah Ab Khalid; Nurul Faezah Khalim; Wan Norfaiezah Md Saiuti; Fatin Shafikah Mahd Sukri; Nur Syuhada Suhaimi; Nurul Fatin Fatiah Azman; Khairunnisa Ayuni Mohd; Nuramirah Zulkifli; Nurmaizatul Hanim Syafi; Kirandeep Kaur Gurdip | Field hockey | Women's team | 16 May |
| Gold | Mohamad Rafaizul Saini; Muhammad Najib Abu Hassan; Wan Muhammad Najmie; Muhamad Ramadan Rosli; Faris Harizan; Perabu Tangaraja; Azmilmuizzudin Misron; Harris Iskandar Osman; Mughni Kamal; Alfarico Lance Liau Jr; Muhammad Addy Jazmi Jamlus; Shahmie Irfan Suhaimi; Muhammad Danish Aiman; Mohd Zaimi Mat Deris; Andywalfian Jeffrynus; Amirul Hamizan Azahar; Muhammad Adam Ashraf Johari; Muhammad Danish Danial | Field hockey | Men's team | 16 May |
| Gold | Ahmad Nor Iman Hakim Rakib | Kickboxing | Men's Kick Light (69 kg) | 16 May |
| Silver | Nur Assyira Zainal Abidin | Cycling — Mountain Bike | Women's Cross-Country | 6 May |
| Silver | Muhammad Aiqal Asmadie | Karate | Men's kata individual | 6 May |
| Silver | Ahmad Faiz Mohammad Noor; Virandeep Singh; Syed Aziz Syed Mubarak; Muhammad Amir Azim Abd Shukor; Syazrul Ezat Idrus; Mohd Nazril Abd Rahaman; Vijay Unni Suresh; Ahmad Zubaidi Zulkifle; Aslam Khan Malik; Muhammad Wafiq Irfan Zarbani; Sharvin Muniyandy; Muhammad Fitri Mohd Sham; Pavandeep Singh Jagjit Singh; Wan Muhammad Azam Wan Ahmad; Muhamad Syahadat Ramli | Cricket | Men's T50 | 7 May |
| Silver | Hariq Izzat Amirul Muhamad; Iqbal Harun; Muhammad Syahmi Aiman Abd Jalani; Shah Rullah Muadzah Sauki; Muhammad Fazrul Izwan Roslan; Reydza Pyar Dasha Mohd Fadilah | E-Sports | PC — Attack Online 2 Team | 7 May |
| Silver | Syed Mohamad Syafiq Syed Cholan; Mohd Nurhafizie Jamil Azomi; Razali Mohd Hazemi; Danial Asyraf Abdul Ghani; Adam Aiman Mamat; Mohamad Hazrul Faiz Ahmad Sobri; Mohd Khairul Afendy Kamaruzaman; Faridzul Afiq Mohd; Muhammad Aslam Mohamed Hanafiah; Muhammad Firdaus Omar; Muhamad Izham Azhar; Abdul Khaliq Hamirin | Hockey — Indoor | Men's team | 7 May |
| Silver | Surizan Awang Noh; Nuraslinda Said; Qasidah Najwa Muhammad Halimi; Nurul Farawahida Marzuki; Fazilla Sylvester Silin; Nur Hazlinda Zainal Abidin; Iren Hussin; Nur Atira Mohamad Ismail; Putri Nur Batrisyia Nor Nawawi; Nor Asfarina Isahyifiqa Isahhidun; Raja Norsharina Raja Shabuddin; Farah Ayuni Yahya | Hockey — Indoor | Women's team | 7 May |
| Silver | Yoong Wei Theng; Mohd Redha Rozlan; Nuur Hafis Said Alwi; Ghalib Mohamad Azimi | Obstacle Race | Men's team relay | 7 May |
| Silver | Muhammad Khairul Shaddad Ardi | Pencak Silat | Men's seni tunggal | 7 May |
| Silver | Nur Syafiqah Hamzah | Pencak Silat | Women's seni tunggal | 7 May |
| Silver | Iskandar Zulkarnain Salim; Izuan Afendi Azlan; Nur Hidayat Ar Rasyid Ahmad Daud; Muhammad Faiz Roslan; Ab Muhaimi Che Bongsu; Mohd Zarlizan Zakaria; Mohd Nazuha Mohd Nadzli; Putera Aidil Israfil Kamaruzaman | Sepak Takraw — Chinlone | Men's Same stroke | 7 May |
| Silver | Jackie Wong Siew Cheer | Athletics | Men's hammer throw | 8 May |
| Silver | Kueggen Vijaya Kumar; Geerijaieswaran Pillai Sivanesan; Muhammad Arif Afifuddin Ab Malik; Kathish S Gnanasekaran; Sharmendran Raghonathan; Sureeya Sankar Hari Sankar; Prem Kumar Selvam | Karate | Men's kumite Team | 8 May |
| Silver | Muhammad Dhiauddin Rozaini; Abdul Latif Mansor | Sailing | 29er | 8 May |
| Silver | Gabriel Gilbert Daim | Aquatics — Diving | Men's 3m springboard | 9 May |
| Silver | Phee Jinq En | Aquatics — Swimming | Women's 100m breaststroke | 9 May |
| Silver | Lim Yin Chuen; Arvin Shaun Singh Chahal; Khiew Hoe Yean; Terence Ng Shin Jian | Aquatics — Swimming | Men's 4 × 100m freestyle relay | 10 May |
| Silver | Nor Sarah Adi | Athletics | Women's pole vault | 10 May |
| Silver | Ting Queenie Kung Ni | Athletics | Women's discus throw | 10 May |
| Silver | Malcolm Ting Siong Hung | Golf | Men's individual | 10 May |
| Silver | Mohd Shahrul Zeckry Sulaiman | Pencak Silat | Men's tanding class F(-75 kg) | 10 May |
| Silver | Muhammad Robial Sobri | Pencak Silat | Men's tanding class I(-90 kg) | 10 May |
| Silver | Siti Shazwana Ajak | Pencak Silat | Women's tanding class D(-65 kg) | 10 May |
| Silver | Bertrand Rhodict Lises | Aquatics — Diving | Men's 10m platform | 11 May |
| Silver | Khiew Hoe Yean | Aquatics — Swimming | Men's 400m freestyle | 11 May |
| Silver | Leong Jun Hao; Ong Ken Yon; Lee Shun Yang; Kok Jing Hong; Chia Wei Jie; Liew Xun; Beh Chun Meng; Goh Boon Zhe; Choong Hon Jian; Yap Roy King | Badminton | Men's team | 11 May |
| Silver | Ahmad Faiz Mohammad Noor; Virandeep Singh; Syed Aziz Syed Mubarak; Muhammad Amir Azim Abd Shukor; Syazrul Ezat Idrus; Mohd Nazril Abd Rahaman; Vijay Unni Suresh; Ahmad Zubaidi Zulkifle; Aslam Khan Malik; Muhammad Wafiq Irfan Zarbani; Sharvin Muniyandy; Muhammad Fitri Mohd Sham; Pavandeep Singh Jagjit Singh; Wan Muhammad Azam Wan Ahmad; Muhamad Syahadat Ramli | Cricket | Men's T20 | 11 May |
| Silver | Nur Amirull Fakhruddin Mazuki | Cycling — Road | Men's criterium | 11 May |
| Silver | Sharifah Afiqah Farzana Syed Ali; Nur Thahira Tasnim Abdul Aziz; Mohamad Muiz Ezham Mohd Rizan | Pétanque | Mixed Triples — 2 Women + 1 Man | 11 May |
| Silver | Leong Chee Feng; Wong Qi Shen; Javen Choong; Danny Ng Wann Sing; Brandon Fong Jay Shern | Table Tennis | Men's team | 11 May |
| Silver | Alice Chang Li San; Ho Ying; Im Li Ying; Karen Lyne anak Dick; Tee Ai Xin | Table Tennis | Women's team | 11 May |
| Silver | Wong Weng Son | Wushu | Men's taolu Jianshu + Qiangshu | 11 May |
| Silver | Moh Keen Hoo; Lim Kok Leong | Billiards Sport | Men's snooker doubles | 12 May |
| Silver | Chin Ken Haw | Taekwondo | Men's Recognized Poomsae Individual | 12 May |
| Silver | Nurul Hidayah Abdul Karim; Nur Humaira Abdul Karim; Lim Jia Wei | Taekwondo | Women's Recognized Poomsae Team | 12 May |
| Silver | Sydney Chin Sy Xuan | Wushu | Women's taolu Taijiquan + taijijian | 12 May |
| Silver | Amirul Zazwan Amir; Mohamad Azlan Alias; Mohammad Syahir Mohd Rosdi; Aidil Aiman Azwawi; Meor Mohamad Zulfikar Mat Amin; Muhammad Afifuddin Mohd Razali; Muhammad Haziq Hairul Nizam; Muhammad Noraizat Mohd Nordin; Norfaizzul Abd Razak; Muhammad Zulkifli Abd Razak; Muhammad Hafizul Hayazi Adnan; Mohd Khairol Zaman Hamir Akhbar | Sepak Takraw — Chinlone | Men's team Regu | 13 May |
| Silver | Ahmad Amir Zainalabadlin; Ahmad Ariff Rasydan; Ahmad Nuqman Hadi Ayob; Khairul Naim Zainal; Mirza Adli Shaharaziz; Fahmi Izwan Shahril; Montoya Raw Ak Michael; Muhammad Fakhrullah; Muhd Aiman Zamberi; Muhammad Bahij Rabbani; Muhammad Nur Rahman; Muhd Ridzuan Abdul Aziz; Muhammad Shahrin Haziq; Nik Afiq Nik Mazli | Traditional boat race | Men's 12 crews (open) 250 m | 13 May |
| Silver | Muhamad Almie Muhamad Yakup; Darryl Chia Soo Yew | Billiards | Men's 9-Ball Pool Doubles | 14 May |
| Silver | Tan Yu Huat; Yeoh Thean Jern | Chess—Xiangqi | Men's Rapid Team | 14 May |
| Silver | Idreen Abdul Jamal; Zul Hisham Noor; Irwandy Lim; Arif Abdul Halim; Danial Fuad; Nazhan Nor; Syafizan Najmi | Esports | Mobile — Men's Mobile Legends: Bang Bang Team | 14 May |
| Silver | Javen Choong; Wong Qi Shen | Table tennis | Men's doubles | 14 May |
| Silver | Aidil Aiman Azwawi; Muhd Noraizat Nordin; Muhd Hafizul Hayazi Adnan | Sepak Takraw — Chinlone | Men's doubles | 15 May |
| Silver | Yap Roy King; Cheng Su Yin | Badminton | Mixed doubles | 16 May |
| Silver | Ahmad Faiz Mohammad Noor; Virandeep Singh; Syed Aziz Syed Mubarak; Muhammad Amir Azim Abd Shukor; Syazrul Ezat Idrus; Mohd Nazril Abd Rahaman; Vijay Unni Suresh; Ahmad Zubaidi Zulkifle; Aslam Khan Malik; Muhammad Wafiq Irfan Zarbani; Sharvin Muniyandy; Muhammad Fitri Mohd Sham; Pavandeep Singh Jagjit Singh; Wan Muhammad Azam Wan Ahmad; Muhamad Syahadat Ramli | Cricket | Men's T10 | 16 May |
| Silver | Amirul Zazwan Amir; Mohamad Azlan Alias; Mohammad Syahir Mohd Rosdi; Muhammad Afifuddin Mohd Razali; Muhammad Zulkifli Abd Razak | Sepak takraw | Men's regu | 16 May |
| Bronze | Phee Jinq En | Aquatics — Swimming | Women's 50m breaststroke | 6 May |
| Bronze | Adam Akaksyah | Ju-jitsu | Men's Ne-Waza Gi (-69 kg) | 6 May |
| Bronze | Naccy Nelly Evvaferra Rojin; Niathalia Sherawinnie Yampil; Lovelly Anne Robberth | Karate | Women's Kata Team | 6 May |
| Bronze | Athachai Saiphawat Kiang | Kun Khmer | Men's Kun Kru | 6 May |
| Bronze | Yoong Wei Theng | Obstacle Race | Men's individual | 6 May |
| Bronze | Wan Athirah Hidayah Ahmad Fuzli | Obstacle Race | Women's individual | 6 May |
| Bronze | Iskandar Zulkarnain Salim; Izuan Afendi Azlan; Nur Hidayat Ar Rasyid Ahmad Daud; Muhammad Faiz Roslan; Ab Muhaimi Che Bongsu; Mohd Zarlizan Zakaria; Mohd Nazuha Mohd Nadzli; Putera Aidil Israfil Kamaruzaman | Sepak Takraw — Chinlone | Men's non-repetition primary | 6 May |
| Bronze | Khiew Hoe Yean; Lim Yin Chuen; Arvin Shaun Singh Chahal; Tan Khai Xin | Aquatics — Swimming | Men's 4 x 200m freestyle relay | 7 May |
| Bronze | Muhammad Arif Afifuddin Ab Malik | Karate | Men's kumite (-84 kg) | 7 May |
| Bronze | Madhuri Poovanesan | Karate | Women's kumite (-55 kg) | 7 May |
| Bronze | Wan Athirah Hidayah Ahmad Fuzli; Ong Sher Lyn; Tan Sui Lin Renee; Yip Hui Teng | Obstacle Race | Women's team relay | 7 May |
| Bronze | Nur Shahida Mohd Sharim; Nur Sarafana Hikma Jailani | Pencak Silat | Women's seni ganda | 7 May |
| Bronze | Nur Durratul Iffah Yazit | Pétanque | Women's singles | 7 May |
| Bronze | Ong Ker Ying | Aquatics — Diving | Women's 3m springboard | 8 May |
| Bronze | Tan Khai Xin | Aquatics — Swimming | Men's 400m individual medley | 8 May |
| Bronze | Sadat Marzuqi Ajisan | Athletics | Men's hammer throw | 8 May |
| Bronze | Zaidatul Husniah Zulkifli | Athletics | Women's 200m | 8 May |
| Bronze | Nurul Hidayah Lukman | Athletics | Women's hammer throw | 8 May |
| Bronze | Muhammad Sharul Aimy; Ng Chun Chen; Luqman Al Hafiz Zulfa; Ally Hamuda Abdullah; Muhmmad Syakir Aiman Subri | Gymnastics — Artistic | Men's team | 8 May |
| Bronze | Shree Sharmini Segaran; Siti Nur Azwani Nor Azli; Madhuri Poovanesan; Shahmalarani Chandran | Karate | Women's kumite Team | 8 May |
| Bronze | Muhammad Faizal Ahmad Asri | Sailing | Men's ILCA 7 | 8 May |
| Bronze | Nur Adlina Nasreen Mohd Nasri | Sailing | Women's ILCA 6 | 8 May |
| Bronze | Muhammad Hilfi Nafael Mohd Hasrizan; Sara Amanda Mohd Noor Azman | Sailing | Mixed Optimist | 8 May |
| Bronze | Muhammad Asnawi Iqbal Adam | Sailing | ILCA 4 | 8 May |
| Bronze | Iskandar Zulkarnain Salim; Izuan Afendi Azlan; Nur Hidayat Ar Rasyid Ahmad Daud; Muhammad Faiz Roslan; Ab Muhaimi Che Bongsu; Mohd Nazuha Mohd Nadzli; Mohd Zarlizan Zakaria; Putera Aidil Israfil Kamaruzaman | Sepak Takraw — Chinlone | Men's Linking | 8 May |
| Bronze | Muhammad Ziyad Zolkefli | Athletics | Men's shot put | 9 May |
| Bronze | Indran Rama Khrisnan | Boxing | Men's Light heavyweight (86 kg) | 9 May |
| Bronze | Muhammad Sharul Aimy | Gymnastics — Artistic | Men's Pommel Horse | 9 May |
| Bronze | Ally Hamuda Abdullah | Gymnastics — Artistic | Men's Rings | 9 May |
| Bronze | Ng Chun Chen | Gymnastics — Artistic | Men's parallel bars | 9 May |
| Bronze | Luqman Al Hafiz Zulfa | Gymnastics — Artistic | Men's High Bars | 9 May |
| Bronze | Muhammad Adam Haiqal Mohd Zaki; Mohd Fadzrul Ismansyah Mohd Faizal | Pétanque | Men's doubles | 9 May |
| Bronze | Koay Hao Sheng; Christian Andre Liew Sheng; Mitsuki Leong Wei Kang | Tennis | Men's team | 9 May |
| Bronze | Khiew Hoe Yean | Aquatics — Swimming | Men's 200m backstroke | 10 May |
| Bronze | Khairul Hafiz Jantan; Muhammad Arsyad Md Saat; Jonathan Nyepa; Mohamad Eizlan Dahalan | Athletics | Men's 4 × 100m Relay | 10 May |
| Bronze | Nur Afrina Batrisyia; Nur Aishah Rofina Aling; Azreen Nabila Alias; Zaidatul Husniah Zulkifli | Athletics | Women's 4 × 100m Relay | 10 May |
| Bronze | Muhammad Abdul Qaiyum Ariffin | Boxing | Men's Flyweight (51 kg) | 10 May |
| Bronze | Foong Zi Yu | Golf | Women's individual | 10 May |
| Bronze | Muhammad Haris Haiqal Bin Helmi | Kun Khmer | Men's (-48 kg) | 10 May |
| Bronze | Tengku Muhammad Adam Fakruzie | Kun Khmer | Men's (-51 kg) | 10 May |
| Bronze | Athachai Saiphawat Kiang | Kun Khmer | Men's (-67 kg) | 10 May |
| Bronze | Muhammad Khairul Shaddad Ardi | Pencak Silat | Men's tanding class U45(<45 kg) | 10 May |
| Bronze | Afiq Aniq Fazly | Pencak Silat | Men's tanding class G(-80 kg) | 10 May |
| Bronze | Nur Syazeera Hidayah Idris | Pencak Silat | Women's tanding class B(-55 kg) | 10 May |
| Bronze | Wan Muhammad Fazri Wan Zahari | Athletics | Men's 800m | 11 May |
| Bronze | Nani Sahirah Maryata | Athletics | Women's shot put | 11 May |
| Bronze | Muhammad Ridzuan Mohd Johari | Boxing | Men's Lightweight (60 kg) | 11 May |
| Bronze | Lim Kok Leong; Moh Keen Hoo | Billiards Sport | Men's snooker 6-red doubles | 11 May |
| Bronze | Nur Aisyah Mohamad Zubir | Cycling — Road | Women's criterium | 11 May |
| Bronze | Vanessa Natasha Abdullah; Sharifah Alia Husna; Anatasha Norman; Hanis Wahidah Mohamad Dashuki; Nurul Effa Fauzana Mohd Fauzi; Wan Nur Adibah Humairah; Nur Afrina Syuhada Ahmad Shaltut | E-Sports | Mobile — Women's Mobile Legends: Bang Bang Team | 11 May |
| Bronze | Muhammad Akashah Bin Ramli | Kun Khmer | Men's (-60 kg) | 11 May |
| Bronze | Akhtar Shauqi Aini Mohd Dom; Jasnina Jasmine Johan Johnson; Amirol Mukminin Mohd Dali | Pétanque | Mixed Triples — 2 Men + 1 Woman | 11 May |
| Bronze | Pang Pui Yee | Wushu | Women's taolu Jianshu + Qiangshu | 11 May |
| Bronze | Muhammad Haiqal Hanafi | Athletics | Men's 100m | 12 May |
| Bronze | Farell Glen Felix Jerus | Athletics | Men's high jump | 12 May |
| Bronze | Umar Osman; Muhammad Firdaus Musa; Tharshan Shanmugam; Ruslem Zikry Putra Roseli | Athletics | Men's 4 x 400m Relay | 12 May |
| Bronze | Nik Nur Atiela; Christina Baret; Winifred Duraisingam; Aisya Eleesa; Mas Elysa; Ainna Hamizah Hashim; Elsa Hunter; Jamahidaya Intan; Mahirah Izzati Ismail; Wan Julia; Dhanusri Muhunan; Aina Najwa; Nur Arianna Natsya; Nur Dania Syuhada; Yusrina Yaakop | Cricket | Women's T50 | 12 May |
| Bronze | Surayya Rizzal | Fencing | Women's Foil Individual | 12 May |
| Bronze | Koay Hao Sheng; Mitsuki Leong Wei Kang | Tennis | Men's doubles | 12 May |
| Bronze | Wong Weng Son | Wushu | Men's taolu Changquan | 12 May |
| Bronze | Tan Zhi Yan | Wushu | Men's taolu Taijiquan + Taijijuan | 12 May |
| Bronze | Pang Pui Yee | Wushu | Women's taolu Changquan | 12 May |
| Bronze | Vicky Hwa Chang | Wushu | Men's sanda (70 kg) | 12 May |
| Bronze | Samuel Yeo Boon Leng | Wushu | Men's sanda (60 kg) | 12 May |
| Bronze | Jee Xin Ru | Chess—Xiangqi | Women's Standard Singles | 13 May |
| Bronze | Nur Aisyah Mohamad Zubir | Cycling — Road | Women's mass start Individual | 13 May |
| Bronze | Cheng Xing Han | Fencing | Men's Foil Individual | 13 May |
| Bronze | Hans Yoong Wei Shen | Fencing | Men's Foil Individual | 13 May |
| Bronze | Foong Zi Yu; Ng Jing Xuen | Golf | Women's team | 13 May |
| Bronze | Siti Norzubaidah Che Ab Wahab; Nur Natasha Amyra Fazil; Nur Syafiqah Jafri; Nur Fatihah Sharudin; Madziatul Rosmahani Saidin; Nur Athirah Roslan; Razmah Anam; Nadillatul Rosmahani Saidin; Sharifah Fifi Nurdyana Wan Rahim | Sepak Takraw — Chinlone | Women's team Doubles | 13 May |
| Bronze | Sebastian Tan Chung Wan | Taekwondo | Men's Kyorugi — Finweight (54 kg) | 13 May |
| Bronze | Muhammad Luqman Hakim Mohd Suhaimi | Taekwondo | Men's Kyorugi — Middleweight (87 kg) | 13 May |
| Bronze | Farah Zulaikha Tokiman; Nur Amirah Anisah Abd Kadir; Nur Atasha Nabila Saring; Nur Syahirah Fuad; Nurul Najieha Zulkifli; Siti Nurul Masyitah Md Elias | Traditional boat race | Women's 3 crews (U24) 250 m | 13 May |
| Bronze | Lim Kok Leong | Billiards | Men's Snooker singles | 14 May |
| Bronze | Mohd Irzam Aman Mohd Zaini; Mohamad Nabil Nazaruddin; Muhammad Daim Rosli; Muhammad Dhiya Ulhaq Mohd Arasz; Nadzrul Abdul Sagal; Azmi Halim | Esports | Mobile — Men's PUBG Mobile Team | 14 May |
| Bronze | Chris Chew Vi Min | Finswimming | Men's 50m Bi Fins | 14 May |
| Bronze | Siti Nor Aisyah Shahabuddin | Judo | Women's (–70 kg) Individual | 14 May |
| Bronze | Alice Chang Li Sian; Im Li Ying | Table tennis | Women's doubles | 14 May |
| Bronze | Fu Cern Put Thai | Taekwondo | Men's Kyorugi — Flyweight (58 kg) | 14 May |
| Bronze | Lee Shun Yang | Badminton | Men's singles | 15 May |
| Bronze | Leong Jun Hao | Badminton | Men's singles | 15 May |
| Bronze | Cheng Su Hui; Cheng Su Yin | Badminton | Women's doubles | 15 May |
| Bronze | Lee Xin Jie; Low Yeen Yuan | Badminton | Women's doubles | 15 May |
| Bronze | Chia Mun Yi; Chong Yin Yin; Foo Suet Ying; Kalaimathi Rajintiran; Lee Phei Ling; Magdelene Low Phey Chyi; Nur Izzati Yaakob; Ooi Poh Yee; Pang Hui Pin; Saw Wei Yin; Tan Sin Jie; Yap Fook Yee | Basketball | Women's 5x5 Team | 15 May |
| Bronze | How Sim Yip; Yeoh Thean Jern | Chess—Xiangqi | Men's Blitz Team | 15 May |
| Bronze | Nik Nur Atiela; Christina Baret; Winifred Duraisingam; Aisya Eleesa; Mas Elysa; Ainna Hamizah Hashim; Elsa Hunter; Jamahidaya Intan; Mahirah Izzati Ismail; Wan Julia; Dhanusri Muhunan; Aina Najwa; Nur Arianna Natsya; Nur Dania Syuhada; Yusrina Yaakop | Cricket | Women's T20 | 15 May |
| Bronze | Amir Daniel Abdul Majeed | Judo | Men's (–73 kg) Individual | 15 May |
| Bronze | Wassof Rumijam | Kickboxing | Men's Low Kick (-51 kg) | 15 May |
| Bronze | Nur Syazwani Radzi | Weightlifting | Women's (64 kg) | 15 May |
| Bronze | Nik Nur Atiela; Christina Baret; Winifred Duraisingam; Aisya Eleesa; Mas Elysa; Ainna Hamizah Hashim; Elsa Hunter; Jamahidaya Intan; Mahirah Izzati Ismail; Wan Julia; Dhanusri Muhunan; Aina Najwa; Nur Arianna Natsya; Nur Dania Syuhada; Yusrina Yaakop | Cricket | Women's T10 | 16 May |
| Bronze | Hans Yoong Wei Shen; Cheng Xing Han; Kaerlan Vinod; Kamalanathan; Goh Wen Hao | Fencing | Men's team Foil | 16 May |
| Bronze | Nehemiah Tharmaraj Steven Solomon; Alfred Lim Wen Jun; Benedict Yeoh Chun Keat; Divesh Mohan; Eugene Lai Yi Qin; Chow Hoong Fee Fabian; Indy Benjamin Toh Ji Min; Lim Kai Sheng; Chong Han Keong; Matthew Lee Ren Tze; Satish Prakasham; Mohamad Shukri Shamidi; Sidney Luke Chin Wen Jian; Sureynjen Manogaran; Timothy Lim Wei Shen; Tristan James Desmond; Zachary Choo Zhi Yung; Zephaniah Chong En Wei | Floorball | Men's team | 16 May |
| Bronze | Aina Syafiqah Mohd Amin; Ang Ling Ling; Asvitha Nadesan; Chean Pei Yi; Chriyenterl Chao Shen Marcus; Ellya Syahirah Ellias; Fathih Hasni Che Husain; Goh Yen Yen; Kuek Ji Mun Michaela Khoo Lee Ann; Naomi Mair Selvanayagam; Nur Anis Amyzaa Zakaria; Nur Dianah Athirah Zulkefley; Nur Shafinaz Mohamed Rafiq; Nur Suraya Ashikin Mohamad Zuraimi; Nur Syafiqah Mohd Zain; Nurfarah Syahira Md Yusof; Sarannia Veeramuthu; Shanggamithara Parameswaran; Teja Ellesa Mohzeiswandi | Floorball | Women's team | 16 May |
| Silver | Siti Norzubaidah Che Ab Wahab; Razmah Anam; Nur Natasha Amyra Fazil; Nur Athirah Roslan | Sepak takraw | Women's Quadrant | 16 May |
| Bronze | Leong Chee Feng | Table tennis | Men's singles | 16 May |
| Bronze | Ahmad Amir Zainalabadlin; Ahmad Ariff Rasydan; Ahmad Nuqman Hadi Ayob; Khairul Naim Zainal; Mirza Adli Shaharaziz; Fahmi Izwan Shahril; Montoya Raw Ak Michael; Muhammad Fakhrullah; Muhd Aiman Zamberi; Muhammad Bahij Rabbani; Muhammad Nur Rahman; Muhd Ridzuan Abdul Aziz; Muhammad Shahrin Haziq; Nik Afiq Nik Mazli | Traditional boat race | Men's 12 crews (open) 800 m | 16 May |

== Athletics ==
65 athletes were sent by the contingent with 38 being men, 27 women.

=== Track & road events ===
Men

| Athlete | Event | Heats | | Final | |
| Athlete | Event | Time | Rank | Time | Rank |
|---|---|---|---|---|---|
| Haiqal Hanafi | 100 m | 10.47 | 1 Q | 10.443 | 3rd place, bronze medalist(s) |
| Khairul Hafiz Jantan | 100 m | 10.37 | 1 Q | 10.448 | 4 |
| Arsyad Saat | 200 m | 21.26 | 3 Q | DNS | — |
| Jonathan Nyepa | 200 m | 21.44 | 3 Q | 21.31 | 4 |
| Umar Osman | 400 m | 47.11 | 1 Q | 46.34 NR | 1st place, gold medalist(s) |
| Abdul Wafiy Roslan | 400 m | 47.76 | 3 Q | 49.17 | 7 |
| Wan Muhammad Fazri | 800 m | 1:53.87 | 1 Q | 1:53.86 | 3rd place, bronze medalist(s) |
| Maheswaren Sunmugom | 800 m | 1:53.68 | 4 Q | 1:55.39 | 6 |
| Maheswaren Sunmugom | 1500 m | —N/a | | 4:13.37 | 12 |
| Prabudass Krishnan | 1500 m | —N/a | | 4:05.13 | 7 |
| Daren James Nair | 3000 m steeplechase | —N/a | | 9:24.21 | 7 |
| Daren James Nair | 5000 m | —N/a | | 15:48.96 | 14 |
| Muhammad Ikbolasen | 5000 m | —N/a | | 15:31.81 | 10 |
| Muhammad Ikbolasen | 10000 m | —N/a | | 34:15.55 | 10 |
| Poo Vasanthan Subramaniam | 10000 m | —N/a | | 34:20.14 | 11 |
| Benedict Ian Gawok | 110 m hurdles | —N/a | | DNF | — |
| Shareem Aleimran Abdul Raheem | 110 m hurdles | —N/a | | 14.672 | 5 |
| Ruslem Zikry Putra Roseli | 400 m hurdles | 53.02 | 2 Q | 52.26 | 5 |
| Khairul Hafiz Jantan; Arsyad Saat; Jonathan Nyepa; Mohamad Eizlan Dahalan | 4x100 m relay | —N/a | | 39.36 | 3rd place, bronze medalist(s) |
| Umar Osman; Wan Muhammad Fazri; Abdul Wafiy Roslan; Muhammad Firdaus Musa; Tharshan Shanmugam; Ruslem Zikry Putra Roseli | 4x400 m relay | —N/a | | 3:08.82 | 3rd place, bronze medalist(s) |
| Fakhrul Razi Jailani | 20 km walk | —N/a | | 2:02:44 | 7 |
| Sriven Tan | 20 km walk | —N/a | | 1:52:59 | 5 |
| Tan Huong Leong | Marathon | —N/a | | 2:40:26 | 4 |

Women

| Athlete | Event | Heats | | Final | |
| Athlete | Event | Time | Rank | Time | Rank |
|---|---|---|---|---|---|
| Zaidatul Husniah Zulkifli | 100 m | 11.69 | 3 Q | 11.83 | 4 |
| Zaidatul Husniah Zulkifli | 200 m | 23.98 | 1 Q | 23.60 | 3rd place, bronze medalist(s) |
| Nur Aishah Rofina Aling | 100 m | 12.04 | 3 Q | 12.12 | 7 |
| Nur Afrina Batrisyia Mohamad Rizal | 200 m | 24.30 | 2 Q | 24.09 | 5 |
| Shereen Samson Vallabouy | 400 m | —N/a | | 52.53 | 1st place, gold medalist(s) |
| Chelsea Cassiopea Evali Bopulas | 400 m | —N/a | | DNS | — |
| Savinder Kaur | 800 m | —N/a | | 2:15.77 | 6 |
| Savinder Kaur | 1500 m | —N/a | | 4:29.10 | 4 |
| Hizillawanty Jamain | 800 m | —N/a | | 2:16.92 | 7 |
| Geetha Sivaraja | 1500 m | —N/a | | 5:00.09 | 8 |
| Farah Syakira Azif Safarin | 100 m hurdles | 14.90 | 4 Q | 14.79 | 8 |
| Mandy Goh Li | 400 m hurdles | —N/a | | 1:00.70 | 4 |
| Zaidatul Husniah Zulkifli; Nor Aishah Rofina Aling; Nur Afrina Batrisyia Mohamad Rizal; Azreen Nabila Alias | 4x100 m relay | —N/a | | 44.58 NR | 3rd place, bronze medalist(s) |
| Chelsea Cassiopea Evali Bopulas; Nurul Aliah Maisarah Nor Azmi; Mandy Goh Li; Shereen Samson Vallabouy | 4x400 m relay | —N/a | | 3:39.89 | 4 |

Mixed

| Athlete | Event | Final | |
| Athlete | Event | Time | Rank |
|---|---|---|---|
| Umar Osman; Abdul Wafiy Roslan; Muhammad Firdaus Musa; Chelsea Cassiopea Evali Bopulas; Zaimah Atifah Zainuddin; Mandy Goh Li | 4x400 m relay | 3:31.25 | 4 |

=== Field events ===
Men

| Athlete | Event | Final | |
| Athlete | Event | Distance (m) | Rank |
|---|---|---|---|
| Shahrizal Nasharuddin | Long Jump | 7.21 | 7 |
| Sunik Muslimin | Long Jump | 6.97 | 9 |
| Andre Anura | Triple Jump | 16.06 | 1st place, gold medalist(s) |
| Izzul Haniff Rafli | Triple Jump | 15.38 | 7 |
| Eizlan Dahalan | High Jump | 2.15 | 4 |
| Farrell Glenn Felix Jurus | High Jump | 2.15 | 3rd place, bronze medalist(s) |
| Naufal Shahrul | Pole Vault | 4.80 | 5 |
| Asrul Badroldin | Pole Vault | 4.40 | 6 |
| Ziyad Zolkefli | Shot Put | 17.30 | 3rd place, bronze medalist(s) |
| Jonah Chang Rigan | Shot Put | 16.67 | 4 |
| Kamal Farhan Abdul Rahman | Discus Throw | 46.76 | 5 |
| Irfan Shamsuddin | Discus Throw | 57.83 | 1st place, gold medalist(s) |
| Syed Abrar Syed Ahmad | Javelin Throw | 55.37 | 7 |
| Sadat Marzuki Ajisan | Hammer Throw | 59.76 | 3rd place, bronze medalist(s) |
| Jackie Wong Siew Cheer | Hammer Throw | 64.20 | 2nd place, silver medalist(s) |

Women

| Athlete | Event | Final | |
| Athlete | Event | Distance (m) | Rank |
|---|---|---|---|
| Nurul Ashikin Abas | Long Jump | 5.67 | 6 |
| Nurul Ashikin Abas | Triple Jump | 13.23 | 4 |
| Ngu Jia Xin | High Jump | DNS | — |
| Yap Sean Yee | High Jump | 1.69 | 5 |
| Nor Sarah Adi | Pole Vault | 4.05 | 2nd place, silver medalist(s) |
| Nani Sahirah Maryata | Shot Put | 14.44 | 3rd place, bronze medalist(s) |
| Nurul Ainin Syauqina Nor Azahar | Shot Put | 12.56 | 4 |
| Queenie Ting Kung Ni | Discus Throw | 50.73 | 2nd place, silver medalist(s) |
| Nur Atiqah Sufiah Hanizam | Discus Throw | 44.39 | 4 |
| Ng Jing Xuan | Javelin Throw | 44.58 | 4 |
| Pavithraa Devi Jayaindran | Javelin Throw | 43.16 | 6 |
| Grace Wong Xiu Mei | Hammer Throw | 61.87 GR | 1st place, gold medalist(s) |
| Nurul Hidayah Lukman | Hammer Throw | 49.61 | 3rd place, bronze medalist(s) |

=== Decathlon/Heptathlon ===
| Athlete | Event | Final | |
| Athlete | Event | Points | Rank |
|---|---|---|---|
| Wilson Quaik Zhe Han | Decathlon | 5090 | 4 |
| Norliyana Kamaruddin | Heptathlon | 4846 | 5 |
| Winnie Eng May Xin | Heptathlon | 746 | 6 |

== Badminton ==
Malaysia sent a total of 20 badminton players with 10 players per gender. Originally, Justin Hoh was called up to participate in the games, however, he was replaced with Kok Jing Hong after rupturing his achilles tendon during training.

Men

| Athlete | Event | First Round | Second Round | Quarterfinals | Semifinals | Final | |
| Athlete | Event | Opposition Score | Opposition Score | Opposition Score | Opposition Score | Opposition Score | Rank |
|---|---|---|---|---|---|---|---|
| Leong Jun Hao | Singles | Bye | J Koh (SGP); W (23–21, 21–14) | J Albo (PHI); W (21–14, 23–21) | C Adinata (INA); L (19–21, 21–23) | Did not advance | 3rd place, bronze medalist(s) |
| Lee Shun Yang | Singles | Bye | Hein H (MYA); W (21–9, 23–21) | P Teeraratsakul (THA); W (18–21, 21–19, 21–17) | C A Dwi Wardoyo (INA); L (15–21, 18–21) | Did not advance | 3rd place, bronze medalist(s) |
| Chia Wei Jie; Liew Xun | Doubles | —N/a | Nguyễn Đ H / Trần Đ M (VIE); W (19–21, 21–12, 21–18) | Nge J J / J Prajogo (SGP); L (19–21, 18–21) | Did not advance | | |
| Beh Chun Meng; Goh Boon Zhe | Doubles | —N/a | S Liza / R Sophanith (CAM); W (21–3, 21–11) | P Sukphun / P Teeraratsakul (THA); L (16–21, 18–21) | Did not advance | | |
| Leong Jun Hao; Ong Ken Yon; Lee Shun Yang; Kok Jing Hong; Chia Wei Jie; Liew Xun; Beh Chun Meng; Goh Boon Zhe; Choong Hon Jian; Yap Roy King | Team | —N/a | —N/a | Vietnam; W 3–1 | Thailand; W 3–2 | Indonesia; L 1–3 | 2nd place, silver medalist(s) |

Women

| Athlete | Event | First Round | Quarterfinal | Semifinal | Final | |
| Athlete | Event | Opposition Score | Opposition Score | Opposition Score | Opposition Score | Rank |
|---|---|---|---|---|---|---|
| Wong Ling Ching | Singles | L Chaiwan (THA); L (9–21, 16–21) | Did not advance | | | |
| Ong Xin Yee | Singles | E N T Wardoyo (INA); L (15–21, 18–21) | Did not advance | | | |
| Lee Xin Jie; Low Yeen Yuan | Doubles | Thân V A / Vũ T A T (VIE); W (21–17, 21–13) | C Korepap / P Opatniputh (THA); W (13–21, 21–19, 21–19) | F D Kusuma / A C Pratiwi (INA); L (9–21, 9–21) | Did not advance | 3rd place, bronze medalist(s) |
| Cheng Su Hui; Cheng Su Yin | Doubles | Đinh T P H / Phạm T K (VIE); W (21–19, 21–15) | Heng X E / E Lai (SIN); W (21–12, 21–11) | M T Puspita Sari / R A Rose (INA); L (10–21, 17–21) | Did not advance | 3rd place, bronze medalist(s) |
| Wong Ling Ching; Ong Xin Yee; Wong Ling Ching; Ong Xin Yee; Lee Xin Jie; Low Yeen Yuan; Cheng Su Hui; Cheng Su Yin; Valeree Siow; Yap Ling | Team | —N/a | Philippines; L 0–3 | Did not advance | | |

Mixed

| Athlete | Event | First Round | Quarterfinals | Semifinals | Final | |
| Athlete | Event | Opposition Score | Opposition Score | Opposition Score | Opposition Score | Rank |
|---|---|---|---|---|---|---|
| Yap Roy King; Cheng Su Yin | Doubles | D W Wee / Heng X E (SGP); W (21–14, 21–17) | V Vannthoun / L Kimloung (CAM); W (21–5, 21–3) | P Teeraratsakul / P Muenwong (THA); W (24–22, 25–27, 21–19) | R N Kusharjanto/ L A Kusumawati (INA); L (22–20, 8–21, 16–21) | 2nd place, silver medalist(s) |
| Choong Hon Jian; Yap Ling | Doubles | H Mengleap / Hong B S (CAM); W (21–9, 21–8) | R Makkasasithorn / C Korepap (THA); L (14–21, 18–21) | Did not advance | | |

== Basketball ==
=== 3x3 Basketball ===
| Team | Event | Group Stage | | | | Semifinals | Final / BM | |
| Team | Event | Opposition Score | Opposition Score | Opposition Score | Rank | Opposition Score | Opposition Score | Rank |
|---|---|---|---|---|---|---|---|---|
| Anthony Liew Wen Qian; Ting Chun Hong; Ooi Xian Fu; Chang Zi Fueng | Men's | Singapore; W 21–15 | Thailand; L 19–21 | Cambodia; L 12–21 | 3 | Did not advance | | |
| Foo Suet Ying; Tan Sin Jie; Tan Pei Jie; Tan Yin Jie | Women's | Cambodia; L 10–22 | Indonesia; L 12–21 | Singapore; W 21–7 | 3 | Did not advance | | |

=== 5x5 Basketball ===
| Team | Event | Group Stage | | | | Semifinals | Final / BM / CM | |
| Team | Event | Opposition Score | Opposition Score | Opposition Score | Rank | Opposition Score | Opposition Score | Rank |
|---|---|---|---|---|---|---|---|---|
| Malaysia men's | Men's | Philippines; L 49–94 | Singapore; W 93–70 | Cambodia; L 90–104 | 3 QC | —N/a | Vietnam; W 94–83 | 5 |

| Team | Event | Round Robin | | | | | | |
| Team | Event | Opposition Score | Opposition Score | Opposition Score | Opposition Score | Opposition Score | Opposition Score | Rank |
|---|---|---|---|---|---|---|---|---|
| Malaysia women's | Women's | Cambodia; W 107–101 (ET) | Singapore; W 75–39 | Indonesia; L 57–85 | Vietnam; W 76–72 | Thailand; W 64–48 | Philippines; L 63–77 | 3rd place, bronze medalist(s) |

== Billiards ==
Men

| Athlete | Event | Round of 32 | Round of 16 | Quarterfinals | Semifinals | Final | |
| Athlete | Event | Opposition Score | Opposition Score | Opposition Score\ | Opposition Score | Opposition Score | Rank |
|---|---|---|---|---|---|---|---|
| Lim Kok Leong | Snooker singles | —N/a | S Chhay (CAM); W 4–3 | S Minalavong (LAO); W 4–0 | A Songsermsawad (THA); L 0–4 | Did not advance | 3rd place, bronze medalist(s) |
| Lim Kok Leong | Snooker 6 red singles | —N/a | Nay M T (MYA); W 5–4 | S Sakbieng (LAO); L 2–5 | Did not advance | | |
| Thor Chuan Leong | Snooker singles | —N/a | P Myint Kaw (MYA); W 4–2 | Chan K K (SGP); W 4–2 | M Sophanith (CAM); W 4–2 | A Songsermsawad (THA); W 4–1 | 1st place, gold medalist(s) |
| Moh Keen Hoo | Snooker 6 red singles | —N/a | S Minalavong (LAO); W 5–4 | T Tech Hok (CAM); W 5–3 | Hein L M (MYA); W 5–0 | S Sakbieng (LAO); W 5–3 | 1st place, gold medalist(s) |
| Lim Kok Leong; Moh Keen Hoo | Snooker doubles | —N/a | S Sakbieng / S Minalavong (LAO); W 1–3 | A A Barbero / J C Roda (PHI); W 3–0 | D Krhistanto / G A W Putra (INA); W 3–1 | M Sophanith / S Chhay (CAM); L 1–3 | 2nd place, silver medalist(s) |
| Lim Kok Leong; Moh Keen Hoo | Snooker 6 red doubles | —N/a | | P Hoài Nguyên / K Thiên Khôi (VIE); W 0–4 | K Lertsattayathorn / W Pu-orb-orm (THA); L 2–4 | Did not advance | 3rd place, bronze medalist(s) |
| Almie Yakup | 9-ball pool singles | —N/a | T Văn Linh (VIE); L 4–9 | Did not advance | | | |
| Almie Yakup | 3-Cushion Carom Singles | —N/a | S S Singh (THA); L 0–1 | Did not advance | | | |
| Darryl Chia Soo Yew | 9-ball pool singles | —N/a | N Anh Tuấn (VIE); L 4–9 | Did not advance | | | |
| Darryl Chia Soo Yew | 3-Cushion Carom Singles | —N/a | J Chandra (INA); L 0–1 | Did not advance | | | |
| Muhammad Almie Yakup; Darryl Chia Soo Yew | 9-ball pool doubles | —N/a | | A Yapp / Toh L H (SGP); W 9–6 | P Boonmoung / S Saetang (THA); W 9–8 | P Myint Kyaw / T Zin Htet (MYA); L 3–9 | 2nd place, silver medalist(s) |

== Boxing ==
Men

| Athlete | Event | Preliminaries | Quarterfinals | Semifinals | Final | Rank |
| Athlete | Event | Opposition Result | Opposition Result | Opposition Result | Opposition Result | Rank |
|---|---|---|---|---|---|---|
| Jackson Chambai Ikeh | –48 kg | —N/a | N Thuamcharoen (THA); L 0–5 | Did not advance | | |
| Qaiyum Ariffin | –51 kg | —N/a | N Sokty (CAM); W RSC | R Siaga (PHI); L 1–4 | Did not advance | 3rd place, bronze medalist(s) |
| Daeloniel McDelon Bong | –54 kg | Bye | C Paalam (PHI); L 0–5 | Did not advance | | |
| Ridzuan Johari | –60 kg | Bye | F Masoara (INA); W RSC | R Juntrong (THA); L 0–5 | Did not advance | 3rd place, bronze medalist(s) |
| Akram Rasit | –63.5 kg | —N/a | S Wongsuwan (THA); L 0–5 | Did not advance | | |
| Aswan Che Azmi | –71 kg | —N/a | A Phoemsap (THA); L 0–5 | Did not advance | | |
| Indran Rama Khrisnan | –86 kg | —N/a | | M Muskita (INA); L 1–4 | Did not advance | 3rd place, bronze medalist(s) |

== Cricket ==
=== Men's tournament ===
| Team | Event | Group Stage | | | Final / BM | |
| Team | Event | Opposition Score | Opposition Score | Rank | Opposition Score | Rank |
|---|---|---|---|---|---|---|
| Men's | T10 | Thailand; W 128/5 (10 overs) – 75/5 (10 overs) | Singapore; L 98/6 (10 overs) – 107/5 (10 overs) | 1 QG | Cambodia; L 96/6 (10 overs) – 106/9 (10 overs) | 2nd place, silver medalist(s) |
| Men's | T20 | Indonesia; W 191/6 (20 overs) – 97/4 (20 overs) | Thailand; W 114/2 (12.3 overs) – 113/8 (20 overs) | 1 QG | Cambodia; L 131 (19.1 overs) – 143/9 (20 overs) | 2nd place, silver medalist(s) |
| Men's | T50 | Thailand; W 79/3 (26 overs) – 78 (10.2 overs) | —N/a | 1 QG | Cambodia; L 245/10 (40.1 overs) – 334/7 (50 overs) | 2nd place, silver medalist(s) |

=== Women's tournament ===
| Team | Event | Group Stage | | | | Final / BM | |
| Team | Event | Opposition Score | Opposition Score | Opposition Score | Rank | Opposition Score | Rank |
|---|---|---|---|---|---|---|---|
| Women's | T10 | Singapore; W 38/1 (4.1 overs) – 37/3 (10 overs) | Thailand; L 39/8 (10 overs) – 40/4 (8.5 overs) | —N/a | 2 QB | Cambodia; W 17/0 (1.5 overs) – 16/7 (10 overs) | 3rd place, bronze medalist(s) |
| Women's | T20 | Thailand; L 41 (15.3 overs) – 53 (18.3 overs) | Philippines; W 23 (2.3 overs) – 21/9 (20 overs) | Myanmar; W 106/8 (20 overs) – 24 (11.5 overs) | 2 QB | Singapore; W 54/2 (9.1 overs) – 51/6 (20 overs) | 3rd place, bronze medalist(s) |
| Women's | T50 | Myanmar; W 123/6 (35.5 overs) – 122 (44.5 overs) | Thailand; L 82 (46.2 overs) – 83/2 (21.3 overs) | —N/a | 2 QB | Cambodia; W 20/0 (1.3 overs) – 19/10 (11.2 overs) | 3rd place, bronze medalist(s) |

== Cycling ==
=== Mountain biking ===
| Athlete | Event | Qualification | | Elimination heats | Semifinals | Final | |
| Athlete | Event | Time | Rank | Rank | Rank | Time | Rank |
|---|---|---|---|---|---|---|---|
| Zulfikri Zulkifli | Men's cross-country | —N/a | | | | 1:16:59 | 5 |
| Zulfikri Zulkifli | Men's elimination | 1:12.731 | 6 | 1 Q | 1 BF | — | 4 |
| Ahmad Syazrin Awang Ilah | Men's cross-country | —N/a | | | | -1 LAP | 15 |
| Muhammad Syawal Mazlin | Men's cross-country | —N/a | | | | 1:20:32 | 10 |
| Muhammad Syawal Mazlin | Men's elimination | 1:14.618 | 9 | 2 Q | 4 SF | — | 5 |
| Nur Assyira Zainal Abidin | Women's cross-country | —N/a | | | | 1:17:09 | 2nd place, silver medalist(s) |
| Nur Assyira Zainal Abidin | Women's elimination | 1:30.249 | 4 | 2 Q | 3 SF | — | 8 |
| Natahsya Soon | Women's cross-country | —N/a | | | | 1:26:42 | 9 |
| Phi Kun Pan | Women's cross-country | —N/a | | | | 1:24:37 | 7 |
| Phi Kun Pan | Women's elimination | 1:31.379 | 6 | 2 Q | 4 SF | — | 7 |
| Zulfikri Zulkifli; Ahmad Syazrin Awang Ilah; Nur Assyira Zainal Abidin; Natahsya Soon | Mixed cross country | —N/a | | | | 53:21 | 4 |

=== Road ===
Men's

| Athlete | Event | Time | Rank |
|---|---|---|---|
| Nur Aiman Mohd Zariff | Road race | 3:32:31 | 19 |
| Nur Aiman Mohd Zariff | Criterium | 1:15:15 | 13 |
| Nur Aiman Rosli | Road race | 3:32:32 | 29 |
| Nur Amirul Fakhruddin Mazuki | Road race | 3:22:50 | 1st place, gold medalist(s) |
| Nur Amirul Fakhruddin Mazuki | Criterium | 1:13:38 | 2nd place, silver medalist(s) |
| Akmal Hakim Zakaria | Road race | 3:24:11 | 13 |
| Akmal Hakim Zakaria | Criterium | 1:13:40 | 6 |
| Mohd Shahrul Mat Amin | Road race | 3:32:32 | 24 |

Women's

| Athlete | Event | Time | Rank |
|---|---|---|---|
| Nur Aisyah Mohamad Zubir | Road race | 2:48:39 | 3rd place, bronze medalist(s) |
| Nur Aisyah Mohamad Zubir | Criterium | 55:19 | 3rd place, bronze medalist(s) |
| Siti Nur Adibah Akma Mohd Fuad | Road race | 2:48:39 | 20 |
| Siti Nur Adibah Akma Mohd Fuad | Criterium | 55:26 | 13 |
| Yeong Zhen Yi | Road race | 2:48:39 | 10 |
| Yeong Zhen Yi | Criterium | 55:19 | 11 |
| Nur Fitrah Shaari | Road race | 2:48:39 | 7 |
| Anis Natasya Ahmad | Road race | 2:49:55 | 28 |

== Dancesport ==
Malaysia will be sending 3 breakdancers, 2 male and 1 female.

Breaking

| Athlete | Event | Pre-selection | | Quarterfinals | Semifinals | Final / BM | |
| Athlete | Event | Points | Rank | Opposition Points | Opposition Points | Opposition Points | Rank |
|---|---|---|---|---|---|---|---|
| Sam Jee Lek (Lego Sam) | Men's | 399.00 | 1 Q | Sailor.D (VIE); W 0–2 | Tflow (THA); W 0–3 | Cheno (THA); W 0–3 | 1st place, gold medalist(s) |
| Faridh Yasin (Khenobu) | Men's | 377.20 | 2 Q | Dudut (PHI); L 1–2 | Did not advance | | |
| Chong Yan Lin (YL) | Women's | 274.50 | 7 Q | Tinie Rawk (VIE); L 0–2 | Did not advance | | |

== Diving ==
Malaysia sent a total of 8 divers, 4 per gender.

Men

| Athlete | Event | Final | |
| Athlete | Event | Points | Rank |
|---|---|---|---|
| Muhammad Syafiq Puteh | 3m springboard | 377.85 | 1st place, gold medalist(s) |
| Gabriel Gilbert Daim | 3m springboard | 365.25 | 2nd place, silver medalist(s) |
| Bertrand Rhodict Lises | 10m platform | 384.00 | 2nd place, silver medalist(s) |
| Enrique Maccartney Harold | 10m platform | 442.95 | 1st place, gold medalist(s) |

Women

| Athlete | Event | Final | |
| Athlete | Event | Points | Rank |
|---|---|---|---|
| Kimberly Bong Qian Ping | 3m springboard | 276.30 | 1st place, gold medalist(s) |
| Ong Ker Ying | 3m springboard | 248.70 | 3rd place, bronze medalist(s) |
| Lee Yiat Qing | 10m platform | 253.80 | 1st place, gold medalist(s) |
| Nur Elisha Rania Abrial Rajagopal | 10m platform | 227.05 | 4 |

== Esports ==
=== PC ===
==== Attack Online 2 ====
| Athlete | Event | Group Stage | | Final | |
| Athlete | Event | Score | Rank | Score | Rank |
|---|---|---|---|---|---|
| Hariq Izzat Amirul Muhamad | Mixed Individual | 138 | 5 | Did not advance | |
| Iqbal Harun | Mixed Individual | 112 | 6 | Did not advance | |
| Shah Rullah Muadzah Sauki | Mixed Individual | 195 | 4 Q | 168 | 6 |
| Fazrul Izwan Roslan | Mixed Individual | 166 | 6 | Did not advance | |
| Reydza Pyar Dasha Fadilah | Mixed Individual | 163 | 8 | Did not advance | |

| Athlete | Event | Group Stage | | | Final | |
| Athlete | Event | Opposition Score | Opposition Score | Rank | Opposition Score | Rank |
|---|---|---|---|---|---|---|
| Hariq Izzat Amirul Muhamad; Iqbal Harun; Syahmi Aiman Abd Jalani; Shah Rullah Muadzah Sauki; Fazrul Izwan Roslan; Reydza Pyar Dasha Fadilah | Mixed Team | Thailand (THA); W 2–1 | Cambodia (CAM); L 0–3 | 2 Q | Cambodia (CAM); L 0–3 | 2nd place, silver medalist(s) |

==== Valorant ====
| Athlete | Event | Group Stage | | | | | | Semifinals | Final / BM | |
| Athlete | Event | Opposition Score | Opposition Score | Opposition Score | Opposition Score | | Rank | Opposition Score | Opposition Score | Rank |
|---|---|---|---|---|---|---|---|---|---|---|
| Fakhrul Najeed Idris; Adam Nazri; Irwandy Lim; Shamir Aliff Saifu Zaman; Tarmizi Rusli | Mixed Team | Cambodia (CAM); L 0–1 | Indonesia (INA); L 0–1 | Philippines (PHI); L 0–1 | Singapore (SGP); L 0–1 | Vietnam (VIE); L 0–1 | 6 | Did not advance | | |

=== Mobile ===
==== Mobile Legends: Bang Bang ====
The Olympic Council of Malaysia (OCM) Esports Selection Taskforce revealed the full lineup of Mobile Legends: Bang Bang Women's Category players who will be competing at the 32nd SEA Games on 13 March 2023. The selection process for the women's category followed a similar format to the open category, where 18 teams duked it out in a closed qualifiers for a chance to represent Malaysia.

| Athlete | Event | Group Stage | | | | | Semifinals | Final / BM | |
| Athlete | Event | Opposition Score | Opposition Score | Opposition Score | Opposition Score | Rank | Opposition Score | Opposition Score | Rank |
|---|---|---|---|---|---|---|---|---|---|
| Idreen Abdul Jamal; Zul Hisham Noor; Irwandy Lim; Arif Abdul Halim; Danial Fuad; Nazhan Nor; Syafizan Najmi | Men's team | Laos (LAO); W 1–0 | Philippines (PHI); W 1–0 | Timor-Leste (TLS); W 1–0 | Vietnam (VIE); W 1–0 | 1 Q | Cambodia (CAM); W 2-1 | Philippines (PHI); L 0–3 | 2nd place, silver medalist(s) |
| Anatasha Norman; Hanis Wahidah Mohamad Dashuki; Nur Afrina Syuhada Ahmad Shaltut; Nurul Effa Fauzana Mohd Fauzi; Sharifah Alia Husna; Vanessa Natasha Abdullah; Wan Nur Abidah Humairah | Women's team | Laos (LAO); W 1–0 | Vietnam (VIE); W 1–0 | —N/a | | 1 Q | Philippines (PHI); L 0–2 | Vietnam (VIE); W 2–0 | 3rd place, bronze medalist(s) |

== Endurance race ==
Aquathlon

| Athlete | Event | Final | |
| Athlete | Event | Time | Rank |
|---|---|---|---|
| Teo Zun Jet | Men's individual | 0:16:31 | 7 |
| Brendon Wong Kai Xuen | Men's individual | 0:18:02 | 12 |
| Ng Wen May | Women's individual | 0:17:51 | 5 |
| Teo Sze Hui | Women's individual | 0:19:07 | 11 |
| Teo Zun Jet; Isaac Tan Zhen Wei; Mayumi Shinozuka; Siobhain Doyle Mei Li | Mixed Team Relay | 1:14:59 | 4 |

Duathlon

| Athlete | Event | Final | |
| Athlete | Event | Time | Rank |
|---|---|---|---|
| Ho Zi Hong | Men's individual | 1:02:29 | 10 |
| Siobhain Doyle Mei Li | Women's individual | DNF | — |
| Tahira Najmunisaa Muhammad Zaid | Women's individual | 1:07:37 | 6 |

Triathlon

| Athlete | Event | Final | |
| Athlete | Event | Time | Rank |
|---|---|---|---|
| Nicholas Long Seh Kit | Men's individual | 1:08:21 | 10 |
| Isaac Tan Zhen Wei | Men's individual | 1:02:26 | 8 |
| Mayumi Shinozuka | Women's individual | 1:19:03 | 9 |
| Ng Wen May | Women's individual | 1:14:01 | 8 |

== Fencing ==
=== Men ===
| Athlete | Event | Preliminaries Pool | | Round of 16 | Quarterfinals | Semifinals | Finals | |
| Athlete | Event | Opposition Score | Seed | Opposition Score | Opposition Score | Opposition Score | Opposition Score | Rank |
|---|---|---|---|---|---|---|---|---|
| Hans Yoong Wei Shen | Individual Foil | K Tima (CAM); W 5–2 | 2Q | —N/a | N M Perez (PHI); W 15–13 | S L Tranquilan (PHI); L 9–15 | Did not advance | 3rd place, bronze medalist(s) |
| Hans Yoong Wei Shen | Individual Foil | S L Tranquilan (PHI); L 3–5 | 2Q | —N/a | N M Perez (PHI); W 15–13 | S L Tranquilan (PHI); L 9–15 | Did not advance | 3rd place, bronze medalist(s) |
| Hans Yoong Wei Shen | Individual Foil | S E Robson (SGP); W 5–2 | 2Q | —N/a | N M Perez (PHI); W 15–13 | S L Tranquilan (PHI); L 9–15 | Did not advance | 3rd place, bronze medalist(s) |
| Hans Yoong Wei Shen | Individual Foil | R Deejing (THA); W 5–4 | 2Q | —N/a | N M Perez (PHI); W 15–13 | S L Tranquilan (PHI); L 9–15 | Did not advance | 3rd place, bronze medalist(s) |
| Hans Yoong Wei Shen | Individual Foil | N Minh Quang (VIE); W 5–4 | 2Q | —N/a | N M Perez (PHI); W 15–13 | S L Tranquilan (PHI); L 9–15 | Did not advance | 3rd place, bronze medalist(s) |
| Cheng Xing Han | Individual Foil | M Kimleng (CAM); W 5–1 | 1Q | —N/a | R Deejing (THA); W 15–11 | S E Robson (SGP); L 6–15 | Did not advance | 3rd place, bronze medalist(s) |
| Cheng Xing Han | Individual Foil | N M Perez (PHI); L 2–5 | 1Q | —N/a | R Deejing (THA); W 15–11 | S E Robson (SGP); L 6–15 | Did not advance | 3rd place, bronze medalist(s) |
| Cheng Xing Han | Individual Foil | M W K Neo (SGP); W 5–1 | 1Q | —N/a | R Deejing (THA); W 15–11 | S E Robson (SGP); L 6–15 | Did not advance | 3rd place, bronze medalist(s) |
| Cheng Xing Han | Individual Foil | S Doungpatra (SGP); W 5–3 | 1Q | —N/a | R Deejing (THA); W 15–11 | S E Robson (SGP); L 6–15 | Did not advance | 3rd place, bronze medalist(s) |
| Cheng Xing Han | Individual Foil | N Văn Hải (VIE); W 5–4 | 1Q | —N/a | R Deejing (THA); W 15–11 | S E Robson (SGP); L 6–15 | Did not advance | 3rd place, bronze medalist(s) |
| Hans Yoong Wei Shen; Cheng Xing Han; Kaerlan Vinod Kamalanathan; Goh Wen Hao | Team Foil | —N/a | | | Bye | Vietnam; L 43–45 | Did not advance | 3rd place, bronze medalist(s) |
| Joshua Koh I-Jie | Individual Épée | V U F Paul (CAM); W 5–2 | 2Q | —N/a | S T J Tong (SGP); L 7–15 | Did not advance | | |
| Joshua Koh I-Jie | Individual Épée | A Williansyah (INA); W 5–3 | 2Q | —N/a | S T J Tong (SGP); L 7–15 | Did not advance | | |
| Joshua Koh I-Jie | Individual Épée | Noelito G J (PHI); L 2–5 | 2Q | —N/a | S T J Tong (SGP); L 7–15 | Did not advance | | |
| Joshua Koh I-Jie | Individual Épée | S T J Tong (SGP); W 5–2 | 2Q | —N/a | S T J Tong (SGP); L 7–15 | Did not advance | | |
| Joshua Koh I-Jie | Individual Épée | K Juengamnuaychai (THA); W 5–3 | 2Q | —N/a | S T J Tong (SGP); L 7–15 | Did not advance | | |
| Joshua Koh I-Jie | Individual Épée | N Phước Đến (VIE); W 5–3 | 2Q | —N/a | S T J Tong (SGP); L 7–15 | Did not advance | | |
| Isaac Seet Kai Xuan | Individual Épée | S Saknuk (CAM); W 5–4 | 5Q | L E E Ergina (PHI); L 11–15 | Did not advance | | | |
| Isaac Seet Kai Xuan | Individual Épée | N Kadafie (INA); W 5–3 | 5Q | L E E Ergina (PHI); L 11–15 | Did not advance | | | |
| Isaac Seet Kai Xuan | Individual Épée | L E E Ergina (PHI); L 3–5 | 5Q | L E E Ergina (PHI); L 11–15 | Did not advance | | | |
| Isaac Seet Kai Xuan | Individual Épée | Simon L (SGP); L 2–5 | 5Q | L E E Ergina (PHI); L 11–15 | Did not advance | | | |
| Isaac Seet Kai Xuan | Individual Épée | N Singkham (THA); W 5–3 | 5Q | L E E Ergina (PHI); L 11–15 | Did not advance | | | |
| Isaac Seet Kai Xuan | Individual Épée | N Tiến Nhật (VIE); L 2–5 | 5Q | L E E Ergina (PHI); L 11–15 | Did not advance | | | |
| Joshua Koh I-Jie; Isaac Seet Kai Xuan; Kelvyn Kok Mancheng; Jesaiah Lyshant Rabindranath | Team Épée | —N/a | | | Thailand; L 35–45 | Did not advance | | |
| Teh Zi Hao | Individual Sabre | P Phearin (CAM); W 5–3 | 5Q | V Srinualnad (THA); L 14–15 | Did not advance | | | |
| Teh Zi Hao | Individual Sabre | R Dhisullimah (INA); L 3–5 | 5Q | V Srinualnad (THA); L 14–15 | Did not advance | | | |
| Teh Zi Hao | Individual Sabre | G S Geofdroy (LAO); L 4–5 | 5Q | V Srinualnad (THA); L 14–15 | Did not advance | | | |
| Teh Zi Hao | Individual Sabre | P Wiriyatangsakul (THA); L 3–5 | 5Q | V Srinualnad (THA); L 14–15 | Did not advance | | | |
| Teh Zi Hao | Individual Sabre | V Thành An (VIE); L 3–5 | 5Q | V Srinualnad (THA); L 14–15 | Did not advance | | | |
| Terry Lee Dong Wei | Individual Sabre | M H B Asahrin (BRU); L 0–5 | 6 | Did not advance | | | | |
| Terry Lee Dong Wei | Individual Sabre | C J M Concepcion (PHI); L 1–5 | 6 | Did not advance | | | | |
| Terry Lee Dong Wei | Individual Sabre | Dan W Z (SGP); L 2–5 | 6 | Did not advance | | | | |
| Terry Lee Dong Wei | Individual Sabre | V Srinualnad (THA); L 2–5 | 6 | Did not advance | | | | |
| Terry Lee Dong Wei | Individual Sabre | N Văn Quyết (VIE); W 5–4 | 6 | Did not advance | | | | |
| Teh Zi Hao; Terry Lee Dong Wei; Keane Leong; Lee Tony | Team Sabre | —N/a | | | Vietnam; L 22–45 | Did not advance | | |

=== Women ===
| Athlete | Event | Preliminaries Pool | | Round of 16 | Quarterfinals | Semifinals | Finals | |
| Athlete | Event | Opposition Score | Seed | Opposition Score | Opposition Score | Opposition Score | Opposition Score | Rank |
|---|---|---|---|---|---|---|---|---|
| Surayya Rizzal | Individual Foil | Y Liza (CAM); W 5–1 | 1Q | —N/a | L L Winona (INA); W 15–7 | Maxine J X W (SGP); L 7–15 | Did not advance | 3rd place, bronze medalist(s) |
| Surayya Rizzal | Individual Foil | M M Matienzo (PHI); W 5–0 | 1Q | —N/a | L L Winona (INA); W 15–7 | Maxine J X W (SGP); L 7–15 | Did not advance | 3rd place, bronze medalist(s) |
| Surayya Rizzal | Individual Foil | Maxine J X W (SGP); W 5–4 | 1Q | —N/a | L L Winona (INA); W 15–7 | Maxine J X W (SGP); L 7–15 | Did not advance | 3rd place, bronze medalist(s) |
| Surayya Rizzal | Individual Foil | C Shinnakerdchoke (THA); W 5–3 | 1Q | —N/a | L L Winona (INA); W 15–7 | Maxine J X W (SGP); L 7–15 | Did not advance | 3rd place, bronze medalist(s) |
| Surayya Rizzal | Individual Foil | L T Thanh Nhàn (VIE); W 5–4 | 1Q | —N/a | L L Winona (INA); W 15–7 | Maxine J X W (SGP); L 7–15 | Did not advance | 3rd place, bronze medalist(s) |
| Resha Shaveena Sabaratnam | Individual Sabre | S Nich (CAM); L 2–5 | 6Q | S Nich (CAM); L 13–15 | Did not advance | | | |
| Resha Shaveena Sabaratnam | Individual Sabre | J Nicanor (PHI); L 2–5 | 6Q | S Nich (CAM); L 13–15 | Did not advance | | | |
| Resha Shaveena Sabaratnam | Individual Sabre | J Heng (SGP); L 0–5 | 6Q | S Nich (CAM); L 13–15 | Did not advance | | | |
| Resha Shaveena Sabaratnam | Individual Sabre | T Phokaew (THA); L 4–5 | 6Q | S Nich (CAM); L 13–15 | Did not advance | | | |
| Resha Shaveena Sabaratnam | Individual Sabre | B T Thu Hà (VIE); W 5–3 | 6Q | S Nich (CAM); L 13–15 | Did not advance | | | |

== Field hockey ==
| Team | Event | Group Stage | | | | | Final / BM | |
| Team | Event | Opposition Score | Opposition Score | Opposition Score | Opposition Score | Rank | Opposition Score | Rank |
|---|---|---|---|---|---|---|---|---|
| Men's | Men's tournament | Cambodia; W 6–0 | Singapore; W 4–3 | Thailand; W 5–0 | Indonesia; W 4–2 | 1 Q | Singapore; W 3–0 | 1st place, gold medalist(s) |
| Women's | Women's tournament | Cambodia; W 8–1 | Singapore; W 4–1 | Thailand; W 3–0 | Indonesia; W 6–0 | 1 Q | Thailand; W 4-1 | 1st place, gold medalist(s) |

== Finswimming ==
Men

| Athlete | Event | Heats | | Final | |
| Athlete | Event | Time | Rank | Time | Rank |
|---|---|---|---|---|---|
| Chris Chew Vi Min | 50m Bi Fins | 20.17 | 2 Q | 19.67 | 3rd place, bronze medalist(s) |
| Chris Chew Vi Min | 50m Surface | 19.08 | 5 | Did not advance | |
| Chris Chew Vi Min | 100m Bi Fins | 45.11 | 1 Q | 44.83 | 6 |
| Chris Chew Vi Min | 200m Bi Fins | 1:49.37 | 5 | Did not advance | |
| Dawish Amssyar | 400m Bi Fins | 4:03.53 | 6 | Did not advance | |
| Dawish Amssyar | 800m Surface | —N/a | | 9:25.22 | 5 |
| Kilian Ung Shihuang | 100m Bi Fins | 47.38 | 5 | Did not advance | |
| Kilian Ung Shihuang | 200m Bi Fins | 1:44.97 | 3 Q | 1:44.94 | 6 |
| Kilian Ung Shihuang | 400m Bi Fins | 3:51.13 | 3 Q | 3:54.45 | 4 |
| Chris Chew Vi Min; Dawish Amssyar; Faliq Nazrin Nazre; Kilian Ung Shihuang | 4x100 m Surface relay | —N/a | | 3:07.03 | 6 |

Women

| Athlete | Event | Heats | | Final | |
| Athlete | Event | Time | Rank | Time | Rank |
|---|---|---|---|---|---|
| Hani Farhana Bonyamin | 50m Bi Fins | 25.92 | 7 | Did not advance | |
| Hani Farhana Bonyamin | 100m Bi Fins | 57.51 | 7 | Did not advance | |
| Hani Farhana Bonyamin | 200m Bi Fins | —N/a | | 2:08.90 | 8 |
| Hani Farhana Bonyamin | 400m Bi Fins | 4:35.84 | 4 | Did not advance | |
| Jamie Tan Guan Jun | 100 m Surface | 51.92 | 5 | Did not advance | |
| Jamie Tan Guan Jun | 100m Bi Fins | 58.31 | 7 | Did not advance | |
| Jamie Tan Guan Jun | 200m Bi Fins | —N/a | | 2:05.43 | 7 |
| Jamie Tan Guan Jun | 400m Bi Fins | 4:32.74 | 4 Q | 4:34.54 | 8 |
| Hani Farhana Bonyamin; Jamie Tan Guan Jun; Elavinyah Ganesh; Zara Aleesya Mohamed Suadi | 4x100 m Surface relay | —N/a | | 4:00.13 | 5 |

Mixed

| Athlete | Event | Final | |
| Athlete | Event | Time | Rank |
|---|---|---|---|
| Chris Chew Vi Min; Falip Nazrin Nazre; Hani Farhana Bonyamin; Jamie Tan Guan Jun; Zara Aleesya Mohamed Suadi | 4x50 m Surface relay | 1:25.07 | 4 |
| Falip Nazrin Nazre; Dawish Amssyar; Hani Farhana Bonyamin; Jamie Tan Guan Jun | 4x100 m Bi Fins relay | 3:31.34 | 7 |

== Floorball ==
| Team | Event | Group Stage | | | | | Final / BM | |
| Team | Event | Opposition Score | Opposition Score | Opposition Score | Opposition Score | Rank | Opposition Score | Rank |
|---|---|---|---|---|---|---|---|---|
| Men's | Men's tournament | Singapore; L 0-6 | Thailand; L 2-10 | Philippines; L 3-8 | Cambodia; W 10-1 | 4 QB | Singapore; L 1-3 | 3rd place, bronze medalist(s) |
| Women's | Women's tournament | Thailand; L 2-5 | Singapore; L 0-13 | Philippines; D 2-2 | Cambodia; W 11-1 | 3 QB | Philippines; L 2-4 | 3rd place, bronze medalist(s) |

== Football ==
| Team | Event | Group Stage | | | | | Semifinals | Final / BM | |
| Team | Event | Opposition Score | Opposition Score | Opposition Score | Opposition Score | Rank | Opposition Score | Opposition Score | Rank |
|---|---|---|---|---|---|---|---|---|---|
| Men's | Men's tournament | Laos; W 5-1 | Thailand; L 0-2 | Vietnam; L 1-2 | Singapore; W 7-0 | 3 | Did not advance | | |
| Women's | Women's tournament | Vietnam; L 0-3 | Philippines; L 0-1 | Myanmar; L 1-5 | —N/a | 4 | Did not advance | | |

== Golf ==
Individual

| Athlete | Event | Round 1 | | | Round 2 | | | Final Round | | |
| Athlete | Event | Score | To par | Rank | Score | To par | Rank | Score | To par | Rank |
|---|---|---|---|---|---|---|---|---|---|---|
| Anson Yeo Boon Xiang | Men's | 72 | E | =8 | 64 | -8 | =2 | 71 | -9 | 4 |
| Malcolm Ting Siong Hung | Men's | 69 | -3 | =1 | 68 | -7 | 4 | 70 | -9 | 2nd place, silver medalist(s) |
| Hariz Hezri | Men's | 76 | +4 | =22 | 73 | +5 | =22 | 70 | +3 | =21 |
| Nateeshvar Anatha Ganesh | Men's | 74 | +2 | =16 | 70 | 0 | =15 | 67 | -5 | =10 |
| Foong Zi Yu | Women's | 72 | E | =4 | 69 | -3 | 4 | 67 | -8 | 3rd place, bronze medalist(s) |
| Geraldine Wong Xiao Xuan | Women's | 75 | +3 | =13 | 76 | +7 | =14 | 71 | +6 | =12 |
| Ng Jing Xuen | Women's | 67 | -5 | 1 | 69 | -8 | 2 | 67 | -13 | 1st place, gold medalist(s) |

Team

| Athlete | Event | Quarterfinals | Semifinals | Final / BM | |
| Athlete | Event | Opposition Score | Opposition Score | Opposition Score | Rank |
|---|---|---|---|---|---|
| Anson Yeo Boon Xiang; Malcolm Ting Siong Hung; Nateeshvar Anatha Ganesh | Men's | Cambodia; W 1.5 (1)–1.5 (0) | Thailand; L 0–3 | Indonesia; L 0–3 | 4 |
| Foong Zi Yu; Ng Jing Xuen | Women's | —N/a | Indonesia; L 1 (0)–1 (1) | Cambodia; W 1 (1)–1 (0) | 3rd place, bronze medalist(s) |

== Gymnastics ==
=== Artistic ===
All-around

| Athlete | Event | Floor (gymnastics) | | Pommel horse | | Rings (gymnastics) | | Vault (gymnastics) | | Parallel bars | | Horizontal bar | | Total All-Around | |
| Athlete | Event | Score | Rank | Score | Rank | Score | Rank | Score | Rank | Score | Rank | Score | Rank | Score | Rank |
|---|---|---|---|---|---|---|---|---|---|---|---|---|---|---|---|
| Sharul Aimy | Individual all-around | 13.450 | 7 | 12.250 | 7 Q | 11.850 | 10 | 13.400 | 13 Q | —N/a | | 11.700 | 12 | 62.650 | 12 |
| Luqman Al-Hafiz Zulfa | Individual all-around | 13.100 | 10 Q | 11.500 | 12 | 12.300 | 8 | 13.850 | 9 | 12.500 | 8 | 12.300 | 5 Q | 75.550 | 4 |
| Ng Chun Chen | Individual all-around | 11.450 | 21 | 12.500 | 4 | 11.950 | 9 | 13.150 | 19 | 13.200 | 5 Q | 11.750 | 10 | 74.000 | 5 |
| Syakir Aiman Subri | Individual all-around | 12.550 | 14 | 10.200 | 18 | —N/a | | 11.650 | 33 | 12.000 | 14 | 10.850 | 19 | 57.250 | 16 |
| Ally Hamuda Abdullah | Individual all-around | —N/a | | | | 13.500 | 3 Q | —N/a | | 12.550 | 7 | —N/a | | 26.050 | 21 |
| Total | Team all-around | 50.550 | 3 | 46.450 | 4 | 49.600 | 2 | 52.050 | 3 | 50.250 | 3 | 46.600 | 3 | 295.500 | 3rd place, bronze medalist(s) |

Apparatus Finals

| Athlete | Floor (gymnastics) | | Pommel horse | | Rings (gymnastics) | | Vault (gymnastics) | | Parallel bars | | Horizontal bar | |
| Athlete | Score | Rank | Score | Rank | Score | Rank | Score | Rank | Score | Rank | Score | Rank |
|---|---|---|---|---|---|---|---|---|---|---|---|---|
| Sharul Aimy | Did not advance | | 12.350 | 3rd place, bronze medalist(s) | Did not advance | | 13.975 | 4 | Did not advance | | | |
| Luqman Al-Hafiz Zulfa | 11.100 | 7 | Did not advance | | | | | | | | 12.250 | 3rd place, bronze medalist(s) |
| Ng Chun Chen | Did not advance | | | | | | | | 12.250 | 3rd place, bronze medalist(s) | Did not advance | |
| Ally Hamuda Abdullah | Did not advance | | | | 13.000 | 3rd place, bronze medalist(s) | Did not advance | | | | | |

== Indoor hockey ==
| Team | Event | Group Stage | | | | | | Final | |
| Team | Event | Opposition Score | Opposition Score | Opposition Score | Opposition Score | Opposition Score | Rank | Opposition Score | Rank |
|---|---|---|---|---|---|---|---|---|---|
| Men's | Men's tournament | Cambodia; W 10–1 | Philippines; W 19–0 | Singapore; W 5–0 | Thailand; W 5–3 | Indonesia; W 3–2 | 1 Q | Indonesia; L 3(1)–3(2) | 2nd place, silver medalist(s) |
| Women's | Women's tournament | Singapore; W 8–0 | Philippines; W 12–0 | Thailand; D 0–0 | Cambodia; W 4–0 | Indonesia; W 4–2 | 1 Q | Thailand; L 0(1)–0(2) | 2nd place, silver medalist(s) |

Roster

The following is the Malaysia roster in the men's indoor hockey tournament.

1. Mohd Khairul Afendy Kamaruzaman (GK)
2. Mohamad Hazrul Faiz Ahmad Sobri (GK)
3. Muhammad Aslam Mohamed Hanafiah
4. Muhammad Firdaus Omar
5. Razali Mohd Hazemi
6. Adam Aiman Mamat
7. Syed Mohd Syafiq Syed Cholan
8. Muhamad Izham Azhar
9. Mohd Norhafizie Jamil Azomi
10. Faridzul Afiq Mohamed
11. Abdul Khaliq Hamirin
12. Danial Asyraf Abdul Ghani

As well as the roster in the women's indoor hockey tournament.

1. Farah Ayuni Yahya (GK)
2. Nur Hazlinda Zainal Abidin (GK)
3. Fazilla Sylvester Silin
4. Surizan Awang Noh
5. Nor Asfarina Isahyifiqa Isahhidun
6. Putri Nur Batrisyia Nor Nawawi
7. Nuraslinda Said
8. Raja Norsharina Raja Shahbuddin
9. Nur Atira Mohamad Ismail
10. Iren Hussin
11. Qasidah Najwa Muhammad Halimi
12. Nurul Farawahida Marzuki

== Jet ski ==
| Athlete | Event | Moto Points | | | | Total | Rank |
| Athlete | Event | 1 | 2 | 3 | Final | Total | Rank |
|---|---|---|---|---|---|---|---|
| Norfirdaus Rafie | Runabout endurance open | 348 | 344 | —N/a | DNR | 688 | 7 |
| Tee Chen Jet | Runabout stock | 39 | 30 | 39 | 39 | 147 | 5 |
| Tee Chen Jet | Runabout 1100 stock | 33 | 39 | 48 | 39 | 159 | 5 |
| Izzah Athirah Ahmad Zuhairi | Runabout 1100 stock | 30 | 27 | DNR | DNR | 57 | 9 |
| Arief Rayhan Rasis | Ski GP | 36 | 36 | 39 | 36 | 147 | 6 |

== Ju-jitsu ==
Key:

- ADV – Won by advantages.
- RDC – Won by referee decision.
- SUB – Won by submission.

Men's

| Athlete | Event | Quarterfinals | Semifinals | Final / BM | |
| Athlete | Event | Opposition Result | Opposition Result | Opposition Result | Rank |
|---|---|---|---|---|---|
| Adam Akaksyah | Ne-Waza Gi -69 kg | S Jantanakha (THA); W 5–0 | N Lim (SGP); L 0–4 | M Espinosa (PHI); W 4–2 | 3rd place, bronze medalist(s) |
| Soo Yan Wei | Ne-Waza No Gi -69 kg | Bye | Đ Đình Tùng (VIE); L 0–2 | A Saputra (INA); L 0–0^{ADV} | 4 |

== Judo ==
| Athlete | Event | Quarterfinals | Semifinals | Final / Repechage | |
| Athlete | Event | Opposition Score | Opposition Score | Opposition Score | Rank |
|---|---|---|---|---|---|
| Haykhal Ridzuan Edi Sutejo | Men's –60 kg | S Phon Long (MYA); L 00–01 | Did not advance | M Alfiansyah (INA); L 00–01 | =5 |
| Amir Daniel Abdul Majeed | Men's –73 kg | U Shintaro (CAM); L 00–01 | Did not advance | K P Nakano (PHI); W 01–00 | 3rd place, bronze medalist(s) |
| Afiq Danish Zapri | Men's –90 kg | A Ng (SGP); L 00–01 | Did not advance | J V D Ferrer (PHI); L 00–01 | =5 |
| Alyaa Yasmeen Rosali | Women's –44 kg | K Ouanvilay (LAO); L 00–01 | Did not advance | S Aulia (INA); L 00–01 | =5 |
| Goh Xuan Le | Women's –52 kg | N T Thanh Thủy (VIE); L 00–01 | Did not advance | F W V Teo (SGP); L 00–01 | =5 |
| Kamini Sri Segaran | Women's –57 kg | C M Noe Wai (MYA); L 00–01 | Did not advance | L N Diễm Phương (VIE); L 00–01 | =5 |
| Amir Daniel Abdul Majeed; Afiq Danish Zapri; Fakhrul Adam Fauzi Cruz; Kamini Sri Segaran; Siti Noor Aisyah Shahabuddin; Nur Ain Hafiezza Amran | Mixed combat team | Indonesia; L 1–4 | Did not advance | | |

| Athlete | Event | Group stage | | | | |
| Athlete | Event | Opposition Result | Opposition Result | Opposition Result | Opposition Result | Rank |
|---|---|---|---|---|---|---|
| Siti Noor Aisyah Shahabuddin | Women's –70 kg | H Yasumatsu (CAM); L 00-01 | S Nanong (THA); L 00-01 | P S Zin Kyaw (MYA); W 01-00 | Y Zhen (SGP); W 01-00 | 3rd place, bronze medalist(s) |

== Karate ==
Kata

| Athlete | Event | First Round | | Final / BM | |
| Athlete | Event | Score | Rank | Opposition Result | Rank |
|---|---|---|---|---|---|
| Muhammad Aiqal Asmadie | Men's individual | 39.4 | 1 QG | A Yuda (INA); L 39.4–39.6 | 2nd place, silver medalist(s) |
| Lovelly Anne Robberth | Women's individual | 39.1 | 2 QB | M Sakulrattanatara (THA); L 39.5–41.3 | 4 |
| Lovelly Anne Robberth; Naccy Nelly Evvaferra; Niathalia Sherawinnie | Women's team | 39.5 | 2 QB | Philippines (PHI); W 39.1–36.9 | 3rd place, bronze medalist(s) |

Kumite

| Athlete | Event | Preliminary | Quarterfinals | Semifinals | Final / BM | |
| Athlete | Event | Opposition Result | Opposition Result | Opposition Result | Opposition Result | Rank |
|---|---|---|---|---|---|---|
| Prem Kumar Selvam | Men's -55 kg | —N/a | M Harith Dahlan (BRU); W 7–0 | H Vongsidar (LAO); W 10–0 | C Setthaphong (THA); W 3–3 | 1st place, gold medalist(s) |
| Sureeya Sankar Hari Sankar | Men's -60 kg | Bye | S Muekthong (THA); W 5–2 | C Văn Đức (VIE); W 10–0 | A Saputra (INA); W 13–5 | 1st place, gold medalist(s) |
| Sharmendran Raghonathan | Men's -75 kg | —N/a | P Escover (PHI); W 6–3 | I Kandou (INA); W 5–3 | S Panith (CAM); W 6–5 | 1st place, gold medalist(s) |
| Muhammad Arif Afifuddin Abdul Malik | Men's -84 kg | —N/a | Đ Thanh Nhân (VIE); W 3–2 | S Firmansyah (INA); L 5–5 | —N/a | 3rd place, bronze medalist(s) |
| Geerijaieswaran Pillai Sivanesan; Kathish S Gnanasekaran; Kueggen Vijayakumar; Muhammad Arif Afifuddin Abdul Malik; Prem Kumar Selvam; Sharmendran Raghonathan; Sureeya Sankar Hari Sankar | Men's team | —N/a | Brunei (BRU); W 3–0 | Cambodia (CAM); W 4–3 | Vietnam (VIE); L 2–3 | 2nd place, silver medalist(s) |
| Shahmalarani Chandran | Women's -50 kg | —N/a | Annisa N (INA); W 5–0 | C Chippensuk (THA); W 4–4 | J Tsukii (PHI); W 1–1 | 1st place, gold medalist(s) |
| Madhuri Poovanesan | Women's -55 kg | —N/a | Bye | C Sanistyarani (INA); L 1–8 | L Sok Vicheka (CAM); W 6–3 | 3rd place, bronze medalist(s) |
| Siti Nur Azwani Nor Azli | Women's -61 kg | —N/a | Bye | J Berberabe (PHI); L 3–6 | N Thị Ngoan (VIE); L 1–9 | 4 |
| Amirah Syahirah Azlan | Women's +68 kg | —N/a | Bye | K Songklin (THA); L 0–5 | D Banurea (INA); L 0–3 | 4 |
| Madhuri Poovanesan; Shahmalarani Chandran; Shree Sharmini Segaran; Siti Nur Azwani Nor Azli | Women's team | —N/a | Philippines (PHI); L 2–2 | —N/a | Laos (LAO); W 2–0 | 3rd place, bronze medalist(s) |

== Kickboxing ==
Men's

| Athlete | Event | Quarterfinals | Semifinals | Final | |
| Athlete | Event | Opposition Result | Opposition Result | Opposition Result | Rank |
|---|---|---|---|---|---|
| Amirul Adli Salee Meha | Full Contact -54 kg | S Naksawad (THA); L 1–2 | Did not advance | | |
| Insyad Rumijam | K1 -51 kg | S S Pattisamallo (INA); L 0–3 | Did not advance | | |
| Nor Iman Hakim Rakib | Kick light -69 kg | J D Olsim (PHI); W 2–1 | T Yipyan (CAM); W 3–0 | F Syach (INA); W 2–1 | 1st place, gold medalist(s) |
| Wassof Rumijam | Kick light -69 kg | Bye | S Rith (CAM); L 0–3 | Did not advance | 3rd place, bronze medalist(s) |

Men's

| Athlete | Event | Quarterfinals | Semifinals | Final | |
| Athlete | Event | Opposition Result | Opposition Result | Opposition Result | Rank |
|---|---|---|---|---|---|
| Damia Husna Azian | Full Contact -48 kg | R D Dacquel (PHI); L 0–3 | Did not advance | | |
| Raja Izati Nabiha Raja Anuar | Light Contact -50 kg | F Febriyanti (INA); L 0–3 | Did not advance | | |
| Hayatun Najihin Radzuan | Low Kick -56 kg | Đ Thị Hoa (VIE); L 1–2 | Did not advance | | |

== Kun Khmer ==
Men's

| Athlete | Event | Quarterfinals | Semifinals | Final | |
| Athlete | Event | Opposition Result | Opposition Result | Opposition Result | Rank |
|---|---|---|---|---|---|
| Muhammad Haris Haiqal Helmi | 48 kg | —N/a | D Đức Bảo (VIE); L 27–30 | Did not advance | 3rd place, bronze medalist(s) |
| Tengku Muhammad Adam Fakruzie | 51 kg | Bye | L Công Nghị (VIE); L 26–30 | Did not advance | 3rd place, bronze medalist(s) |
| Iskandar Zulgarnain | 54 kg | S Keothatalath (LAO); L 9–10 | Did not advance | | |
| Muhammad Akashah Ramli | 60 kg | Bye | C Vanthong (CAM); L 17–20 | Did not advance | 3rd place, bronze medalist(s) |
| Athachai Saiphawat Kiang | 67 kg | Bye | L Chetra (CAM); L KO | Did not advance | 3rd place, bronze medalist(s) |
| Jonathan Lim Chun Fong | 71 kg | N Hồng Quân (VIE); L 27–30 | Did not advance | | |

Kun Kru

| Athlete | Event | Final | |
| Athlete | Event | Score | Rank |
|---|---|---|---|
| Athachai Saiphawat Kiang | Men's | 45 | 3rd place, bronze medalist(s) |

== Obstacle race ==
| Athlete | Event | Elimination round | | | | | | Final / BM | |
| Athlete | Event | Run 1 | | Run 2 | | Best Time | Rank | Time | Rank |
| Athlete | Event | Time | Rank | Time | Rank | Best Time | Rank | Time | Rank |
|---|---|---|---|---|---|---|---|---|---|
| Yoong Wei Theng | Men's individual | 0:26.549 | 3 | 0:50.774 | 7 | 0:26.549 | 4 QB | 0:28.234 | 3rd place, bronze medalist(s) |
| Nuur Hafis Said Alwi | Men's individual | 0:27.358 | 5 | 0:27.230 | 4 | 0:27.230 | 5 | Did not advance | |
| Wan Atirah Hidayah Ahmad Fuzli | Women's individual | 2:00.000 | 7 | 1:01.872 | 4 | 1:01.872 | 4 QB | 0:41.724 | 3rd place, bronze medalist(s) |
| Ghabis Mohamad Azimi; Mohd Redha Rozlan; Nuur Hafis Said Alwi; Yoong Wei Theng | Men's team relay | DNS | — | 0:25.624 | 1 | 0:25.624 | 1 QG | 0:25.15 | 2nd place, silver medalist(s) |
| Ong Sher Lyn; Tan Sui Lin Renee; Wan Atirah Hidayah Ahmad Fuzli; Yip Hui Theng | Women's team relay | 3:45.908 | 3 | 3:12.980 | 3 | 3:12.980 | 3 QB | 0:41.00 | 3rd place, bronze medalist(s) |

== Ouk chaktrang ==
Men

| Athlete | Event | Group Stage/Round Robin | | | | | | | | Semifinals | Finals | Rank |
| Athlete | Event | Round 1 | Round 2 | Round 3 | Round 4 | Round 5 | Round 6 | Round 7 | Rank | Semifinals | Finals | Rank |
| Athlete | Event | Opposition Score | Opposition Score | Opposition Score | Opposition Score | Opposition Score | Opposition Score | Opposition Score | Rank | Semifinals | Finals | Rank |
|---|---|---|---|---|---|---|---|---|---|---|---|---|
| Tin Shan Wen | Singles 60-minute | Aung N (MYA); D 0.5–0.5 | —N/a | V Thành Ninh (VIE); L 0–1 | E Oseo (PHI); L 0–1 | C Yang (LAO); W 1–0 | S Kakada (CAM); L 0–1 | —N/a | 4 | Did not advance | | |
| Eshwant Singh; Nhavin Kumaresan | Doubles 60-minute | J Garcia / P Sales (PHI); L 0–1 | C Yang / K Senglek (LAO); W 1–0 | W Kananub / W Timsri (THA); L 0–1 | —N/a | N Quang Trung / P Trọng Bình (VIE); D 0.5–0.5 | Maung M / Naing M (MYA); L 0–1 | B Bunmalyka / Y Sok Leang (CAM); L 0–1 | 6 | —N/a | | |
| Eshwant Singh; Nhavin Kumaresan; Tin Shan Wen | Triples 60-minute | Thailand (THA); L 0–1 | Philippines (PHI); L 0–1 | Myanmar (MYA); L 0–1 | Cambodia (CAM); L 0–1 | Vietnam (VIE); L 0–1 | —N/a | | 6 | —N/a | | |

Women

| Athlete | Event | Round Robin | | | | | | | | Semifinals | Finals | Rank |
| Athlete | Event | Round 1 | Round 2 | Round 3 | Round 4 | Round 5 | Round 6 | Round 7 | Rank | Semifinals | Finals | Rank |
| Athlete | Event | Opposition Score | Opposition Score | Opposition Score | Opposition Score | Opposition Score | Opposition Score | Opposition Score | Rank | Semifinals | Finals | Rank |
|---|---|---|---|---|---|---|---|---|---|---|---|---|
| Chua Jie Tien | Singles 60-minute | S Sukpancharoen (THA); D 0.5–0.5 | V Vicente (PHI); D 0.5–0.5 | M Inthavong (LAO); W 1–0 | Su S (MYA); W 1–0 | P Khemrareaksmey (CAM); W 1–0 | V T Diệu Uyên (VIE); L 0–1 | —N/a | 3 | Did not advance | | |
| Nur Faiqah Aminuddin | Singles 60-minute | S Chuemsakul (THA); D 0.5–0.5 | S Garcia (PHI); L 0–1 | H Phonesavanh (LAO); W 1–0 | Soe M (MYA); L 0–1 | T Sokratha (CAM); L 0–1 | Đ T Hồng Nhung (VIE); L 0–1 | —N/a | 6 | Did not advance | | |
| Chua Jie Tien; Nur Faiqah Aminuddin | Doubles 60-minute | S Chuemsakul / S Sukpancharoen (THA)D 1–1 | J Bermas / S Garcia (PHI); L 0–1 | H Phonesavanh / M Inthavong (LAO); W 1–0 | T N Hồng Ân / P T Phương Thảo (VIE); L 0–1 | P Khemrareaksmey / T Sokratha (CAM); W 1–0 | Soe M / Su S (MYA); L 0–1 | —N/a | 5 | —N/a | | |

== Pencak silat ==
Seni

| Athlete | Event | First Round | Quarterfinals | Semifinals | Final | |
| Athlete | Event | Opposition Score | Opposition Score | Opposition Score | Opposition Score | Rank |
|---|---|---|---|---|---|---|
| Khairul Shaddad Ardi | Men's tunggal | Bye | C Sayasan (LAO); W 9.955–9.915 | P Hải Tiến (VIE); W 9.945–9.920 | S Sokdevid (CAM); L 9.930–9.960 | 2nd place, silver medalist(s) |
| Danial Azray Noorazizan; Danial Azrol Noorazizan | Men's ganda | —N/a | —N/a | V Bình Phước / Đ Đức Hùng (VIE); W 9.945–9.880 | A J Abad / A Abad (PHI); W 9.945–9.885 | 1st place, gold medalist(s) |
| Nur Syafiqah Hamzah | Women's tunggal | —N/a | M Padios (PHI); W 9.960–9.925 | V Thị Bình (VIE); W 9.960–9.915 | Puspa A (INA); L 9.915–9.970 | 2nd place, silver medalist(s) |
| Nur Sarafina Hikma Jalani; Nur Shahida Mohd Sharim | Women's ganda | —N/a | —N/a | R Rinasih / R Hermawan (INA); L 9.880–9.955 | Did not advance | 3rd place, bronze medalist(s) |

Tanding

| Athlete | Event | Round of 16 | Quarterfinals | Semifinals | Final | |
| Athlete | Event | Opposition Score | Opposition Score | Opposition Score | Opposition Score | Rank |
|---|---|---|---|---|---|---|
| Khairul Shaddad Ardi | Men's class U45 | —N/a | | N Sromoachkroham (CAM); L 0–20 | Did not advance | 3rd place, bronze medalist(s) |
| Amizul Azmi Ridzuan | Men's class A | —N/a | B Văn Thống (VIE); L 23–34 | Did not advance | | |
| Khairi Adib Azhar | Men's class B | —N/a | N Thế Vũ (VIE); L 13–35 | Did not advance | | |
| Hazim Amzad | Men's class C | —N/a | V Văn Kiên (VIE); L 26–35 | Did not advance | | |
| Izzul Irfan Marzuki | Men's class D | —N/a | A Chemaeng (THA); W 67–22 | A Chandy (CAM); W 27–6 | K Prayada (INA); W 39–33 | 1st place, gold medalist(s) |
| Shahrul Zeckry Sulaiman | Men's class F | Bye | Khairul Bahri (BRU); W 34–4 | A Maehchi (THA); W 44–42 | I Pratama (INA); L 9–53 | 2nd place, silver medalist(s) |
| Afiq Aniq Fazly | Men's class G | —N/a | Bye | Sheik Ferdous (SGP); L 13–28 | Did not advance | 3rd place, bronze medalist(s) |
| Abdul Latif Maxzkir | Men's class H | —N/a | P Tonkhieo (THA); W 41–56 | Did not advance | | |
| Robial Sobri | Men's class I | —N/a | Bye | S Glompan (THA); W 17–10 | Sheik Farhan (SGP); L 11–42 | 2nd place, silver medalist(s) |
| Norsyakirah Muksin | Women's class U45 | —N/a | C By Siv (CAM); W 46–0 | Nur Thufah Izzah (SGP); W 6–0 | Suci W (INA); W 36–33 | 1st place, gold medalist(s) |
| Nor Farah Mazlan | Women's class A | —N/a | Bye | F Duromae (THA); W 58–36 | Nadhrah (SGP); W 20–0 | 1st place, gold medalist(s) |
| Nur Syazeera Hidayah Idris | Women's class B | —N/a | Nur Syaza Insyirah (SGP); L 14–48 | Did not advance | | |
| Siti Shazwana Ajak | Women's class D | —N/a | Siti Khadijah (SGP); W 56–18 | P Moniroth (CAM); W 46–5 | Atifa F (INA); L 35–38 | 2nd place, silver medalist(s) |
| Nor Ainun Mokhtar | Women's class E | —N/a | Q T Thu Nghĩa (VIE); L 11–47 | Did not advance | | |

== Pétanque ==
Malaysia sent 24 athletes (12 from each gender) to compete in the sport of pétanque.

Men's

| Athlete | Event | Group Stage | | | | | | Semifinals | Final / BM | |
| Athlete | Event | Opposition Score | Opposition Score | Opposition Score | Opposition Score | Opposition Score | Rank | Opposition Score | Opposition Score | Rank |
|---|---|---|---|---|---|---|---|---|---|---|
| Saiful Bahri Musmin | Singles | S Chanmean (CAM); L 6–8 | B Southammavong (LAO); L 10–12 | J Bon (PHI); W 8–7 | A Meekhong (THA); L 4–13 | N V Hào Em (VIE); W 13–6 | 4 Q | A Meekhong (THA); W 13–5 | B Southammavong (LAO); W 13–9 | 1st place, gold medalist(s) |
| Fadzrul Ismansyah Faizal; Adam Haiqal Zaki | Doubles | D Palaming / M Baniega (PHI); W 13–4 | R Ngo / D Sà Phanl (VIE); L 1–13 | —N/a | | | 2 Q | S Chanmean (CAM); L 8–13 | Did not advance | |

Women's

| Athlete | Event | Group Stage | | | Semifinals | Final / BM | |
| Athlete | Event | Opposition Score | Opposition Score | Rank | Opposition Score | Opposition Score | Rank |
|---|---|---|---|---|---|---|---|
| Nur Durratul Iffah Yazit | Singles | U Sreya (CAM); W 7–6 | S Sarachip (THA); L 7–12 | 2 Q | T T Hồng Thoa (VIE); L 8–13 | Did not advance | 3rd place, bronze medalist(s) |
| Nur Azleen Azlan; Nurul Balqis Fuzian | Doubles | A Rojas / M Cruz (PHI); L 7–11 | P Wongchuvej / T Thamakord (THA); L 2–13 | 3 | Did not advance | | |

Mixed

| Athlete | Event | Group Stage | | | | | Semifinals | Final / BM | |
| Athlete | Event | Opposition Score | Opposition Score | Opposition Score | Opposition Score | Rank | Opposition Score | Opposition Score | Rank |
|---|---|---|---|---|---|---|---|---|---|
| Ikhmal Othman; Sharifah Aqilah Farhana Syed Ali | Doubles | N Chourlyka / S Sophearann (CAM); L 5–10 | N Manythone / T Keokannika (LAO); L 9–10 | N Fueangsanit / S Sriboonpeng (THA); L 4–13 | H Công Tâm / N T T Thúy Kiều (VIE); L 2–13 | 5 | Did not advance | | |
| Akhtar Shauqi; Amirol Mukminin; Jasjina Jasmine | Triples (2 men and 1 women) | Cambodia; L 3–13 | Philippines; W 12–11 | —N/a | | 2 Q | Laos; L 8–13 | Did not advance | 3rd place, bronze medalist(s) |
| Muiz Ezham Rizan; Nur Thahira Tasnim; Sharifah Afiqah Farzana | Triples (2 women and 1 men) | Philippines; W 13–6 | Vietnam; W 13–4 | Laos; L 5–10 | —N/a | 2 Q | Cambodia; W 13–8 | Thailand; L 6–13 | 2nd place, silver medalist(s) |

Shooting

| Athlete | Event | First Round | | Second Round | | Semifinals | Final / BM | |
| Athlete | Event | Score | Rank | Score | Rank | Opposition Score | Score | Rank |
|---|---|---|---|---|---|---|---|---|
| Ayzek Hakimi Safingan | Men's | 18 | 7 | 22 | 4 | Did not advance | | |
| Nur Durratul Iffah Yazit | Women's | 16 | 6 | 29 | 3 | Did not advance | | |

== Sailing ==
| Team | Event | Race | | | | | | | | | | | | | TP | NP | Rank |
| Team | Event | 1 | 2 | 3 | 4 | 5 | 6 | 7 | 8 | 9 | 10 | 11 | 12 | MR | TP | NP | Rank |
|---|---|---|---|---|---|---|---|---|---|---|---|---|---|---|---|---|---|
| Mohd Faizal Ahmad Asri | Men's ILCA 7 | 2 | (~~3~~) | 3 | 3 | 2 | 2 | 3 | 3 | 3 | 3 | —N/a | | 4 | 31 | 28 | 3rd place, bronze medalist(s) |
| Izry Hafiezy Fitry Azri | Men's windsurfing RS:One | 2 | 1 | 3 | 2 | (~~5~~) | 1 | 2 | 3 | 1 | 4 | 1 | 3 | 2 | 30 | 25 | 1st place, gold medalist(s) |
| Muhammad Hafizin Mansor | Men's windsurfing RS:X | (~~3~~) | 1 | 2 | 1 | 1 | 1 | 1 | 1 | 2 | 1 | 1 | 1 | 2 | 18 | 15 | 1st place, gold medalist(s) |
| Nur Adlina Nasreen Mohd Nasri | Women's ILCA 6 | (~~3~~) | 3 | 2 | 2 | 3 | 2 | 3 | 3 | 1 | 3 | —N/a | | 6 | 31 | 28 | 3rd place, bronze medalist(s) |
| Muhammad Asnawi Iqbal Adam | ICLA 4 | 2 | 2 | 2 | (~~3~~) | 2 | 3 | 3 | 3 | 3 | 2 | —N/a | | 6 | 31 | 28 | 3rd place, bronze medalist(s) |
| Muhammad Dhiauddin Rozaini; Abdul Latif Mansor | 29er | 1 | 1 | (~~3~~) | 2 | 3 | 2 | 1 | 3 | 2 | 2 | 1 | 1 | 4 | 26 | 23 | 2nd place, silver medalist(s) |
| Muhammad Hilfi Nafael Mohd Hasrizan; Sara Amanda Mohd Nor Azman | Mixed Optimist | 5; 4 | (~~7~~); 4 | 5; 4 | 4 (~~6~~) | 6; 5 | 6; 5 | 6; 3 | 5; 4 | 3; 6 | 4; 5 | —N/a | | 14; 8 | 119; 65; 54 | 106; 58; 48 | 3rd place, bronze medalist(s) |

== Sepak takraw ==
Men's

| Athlete | Event | Round Robin | | | |
| Athlete | Event | Opposition Score | Opposition Score | Opposition Score | Rank |
|---|---|---|---|---|---|
| Amirul Zazwan Amir; Afifuddin Razali; Zulkifli Abdul Razak; Azlan Alias; Syahir Rosdi | Regu | Cambodia (CAM); W 2–0 | Singapore (SGP); W 2–0 | Thailand (THA); L 1–2 | 2nd place, silver medalist(s) |
| Amirul Zazwan Amir; Syahir Rosdi; Khairol Zaman Hamir Akbar; Aidil Aiman Zawawi; Afifuddin Razali; Zulkifli Abdul Razak; Hafizul Hayazi Adnan; Haziq Hairul Nizam; Norfaizzul Abd Razak; Meor Zulfikar Mat Amin; Azlan Alias; Noraizat Nordin | Team Regu | Cambodia (CAM); W 3–0 | Thailand (THA); L 1–2 | —N/a | 2nd place, silver medalist(s) |

| Athlete | Event | Group Stage | | | | Semifinals | Final | |
| Athlete | Event | Opposition Score | Opposition Score | Opposition Score | Rank | Opposition Score | Opposition Score | Rank |
|---|---|---|---|---|---|---|---|---|
| Aidil Aiman Zawawi; Noraizat Nordin; Hafizul Hayazi Adnan | Doubles | Cambodia (CAM); W 2–0 | Myanmar (MYA); W 2–0 | Thailand (THA); W 2–0 | 1 Q | Cambodia (CAM); W 2–1 | Indonesia (INA); L 1–2 | 2nd place, silver medalist(s) |

Women's

| Athlete | Event | Group Stage | | | Semifinals | Final | |
| Athlete | Event | Opposition Score | Opposition Score | Rank | Opposition Score | Opposition Score | Rank |
|---|---|---|---|---|---|---|---|
| Nur Athirah RoslanNur Fatihah Shahrudin; Razmah Anam; Siti Nor Zubaidah Che Ab Wahab; Madziatul Rosmahani Saidin; Nur Natasha Amyra Fazil | Quadrant | Cambodia (CAM); W 2–0 | Thailand (THA); L 0–2 | 2 Q | Vietnam (VIE); L 0–2 | Did not advance | 3rd place, bronze medalist(s) |

| Athlete | Event | Round Robin | | | | |
| Athlete | Event | Opposition Score | Opposition Score | Opposition Score | Opposition Score | Rank |
|---|---|---|---|---|---|---|
| Nur Fatihah Shahrudin; Siti Nor Zubaidah Che Ab Wahab; Madziatul Rosmahani Saidin; Razmah Anam; Nurul Syafiqah Jafri; Sharifah Fifi Nurdyana; Nadillatul Rosmahani Saidin; Nur Athirah Roslan; Nur Natasha Amyra Fazil | Team Doubles | Cambodia (CAM); W 3–0 | Laos (LAO); L 0–3 | Thailand (THA); L 0–3 | Timor-Leste (TLS); W 3–0 | 3rd place, bronze medalist(s) |

Chinlone

| Athlete | Event | Preliminary | | | Final | | |
| Athlete | Event | Set 1 | Set 2 | Rank | Set 1 | Set 2 | Rank |
| Athlete | Event | Score | Score | Rank | Score | Score | Rank |
|---|---|---|---|---|---|---|---|
| Ab Muhaimi Che Bongsu; Iskandar Zulkarnain Salim; Izuan Afandi Azlan; Nazuha Nadzli; Zarlizan Zakaria; Faiz Roslan; Nur Hidayat Ar Rashid Ahmad Daud; Putera Aidil Israfil Kamaruzaman | Men's linking | 154 | 164 | 3 Q | 161 | 153 | 3rd place, bronze medalist(s) |
| Ab Muhaimi Che Bongsu; Iskandar Zulkarnain Salim; Izuan Afandi Azlan; Nazuha Nadzli; Zarlizan Zakaria; Faiz Roslan; Nur Hidayat Ar Rashid Ahmad Daud; Putera Aidil Israfil Kamaruzaman | Men's non-repetition primary | 111 | 138 | 4 Q | 133 | 141 | 3rd place, bronze medalist(s) |
| Ab Muhaimi Che Bongsu; Iskandar Zulkarnain Salim; Izuan Afandi Azlan; Nazuha Nadzli; Zarlizan Zakaria; Faiz Roslan; Nur Hidayat Ar Rashid Ahmad Daud; Putera Aidil Israfil Kamaruzaman | Men's same stroke | 88 | 88 | 3 Q | 89 | 90 | 2nd place, silver medalist(s) |

== Swimming ==
18 athletes were sent by the contingent with 10 being men and 8 women.

Men

| Athlete | Event | Heats | | Final | |
| Athlete | Event | Time | Rank | Time | Rank |
|---|---|---|---|---|---|
| Lim Yin Chuen | 100 m butterfly | 55.34 | 5 Q | 55.38 | 8 |
| Lim Yin Chuen | 200 m butterfly | 2:06.99 | 4Q | 2:05.53 | 8 |
| Lim Yin Chuen | 100 m freestyle | 51.04 | 1 Q | 50.73 | 6 |
| Bryan Leong Xin Ren | 50 m butterfly | 24.71 | 5Q | 24.53 | 8 |
| Bryan Leong Xin Ren | 100 m butterfly | 53.57 | 1 Q | 53.51 | 5 |
| Bryan Leong Xin Ren | 50 m freestyle | 23.21 | 2 Q | 23.18 | 4 |
| Bryan Leong Xin Ren | 50 m breaststroke | 28.84 | 4Q | 28.84 | 8 |
| Low Zheng Yong | 200 m butterfly | 2:04.92 | 3Q | 2:04.13 | 6 |
| Low Zheng Yong | 1500 m freestyle | 16:07.94 | 6 | Did not advance | |
| Low Zheng Yong | 400 m individual medley | —N/a | | 4:47.88 | 8 |
| Terence Ng Shin Jian | 100 m backstroke | 1:00.03 | 6 | Did not advance | |
| Khiew Hoe Yean | 100 m freestyle | 50.73 | 2 Q | 49.89 | 4 |
| Khiew Hoe Yean | 200 m freestyle | 1:51.03 | 2 Q | 1:48.91 | 1st place, gold medalist(s) |
| Khiew Hoe Yean | 400 m freestyle | 3:59.01 | 1Q | 3:50.39 | 2nd place, silver medalist(s) |
| Khiew Hoe Yean | 200 m backstroke | 2:10.10 | 4 Q | 2:01.74 | 3rd place, bronze medalist(s) |
| Arvin Shaun Singh Chahal | 50 m freestyle | 23.99 | 4 | Did not advance | |
| Arvin Shaun Singh Chahal | 200 m freestyle | 1:52.03 | 3 Q | 1:52.24 | 8 |
| Arvin Shaun Singh Chahal | 50 m backstroke | 26.84 | 4 Q | 27.04 | 8 |
| Arvin Shaun Singh Chahal | 200 m individual medley | 2:05.33 | 1 Q | 2:03.79 | 5 |
| Tan Khai Xin | 400 m freestyle | 4:01.73 | 4Q | 4:00.69 | 8 |
| Tan Khai Xin | 200 m individual medley | 2:07.48 | 2 Q | 2:05.46 | 7 |
| Tan Khai Xin | 400 m individual medley | —N/a | | 4:23.24 NR | 3rd place, bronze medalist(s) |
| Muhammad Dhuha Zulfikry | 1500 m freestyle | —N/a | | 16:07.90 | 6 |
| Hii Puong Wei | 100 m backstroke | 58.48 | 4 | Did not advance | |
| Hii Puong Wei | 100 m breaststroke | 1:03.70 | 3 Q | 1:04.07 | 8 |
| Hii Puong Wei | 200 m breaststroke | 2:20.81 | 4 Q | 2:19.98 | 7 |
| Andrew Goh Zheng Yen | 50 m breaststroke | 28.54 | 2Q | 28.19 | 4 |
| Andrew Goh Zheng Yen | 100 m breaststroke | 1:02.77 | 1 Q | 1:02.45 | 5 |
| Andrew Goh Zheng Yen | 200 m breaststroke | 2:20.69 | 3 Q | 2:17.07 | 5 |
| Khiew Hoe Yean; Lim Yin Chuen; Terence Ng Shin Jian; Arvin Shaun Singh Chahal | 4x100 m freestyle relay | —N/a | | 3:20.61 | 2nd place, silver medalist(s) |
| Khiew Hoe Yean; Tan Khai Xin; Lim Yin Chuen; Arvin Shaun Singh Chahal | 4x200 m freestyle relay | —N/a | | 7:21.55 | 3rd place, bronze medalist(s) |
| Khiew Hoe Yean; Bryan Leong Xin Ren; Arvin Shaun Singh Chahal; Tan Khai Xin | 4x100 m medley relay | —N/a | | 3:42.12 NR | 5 |

Women

| Athlete | Event | Heats | | Final | |
| Athlete | Event | Time | Rank | Time | Rank |
|---|---|---|---|---|---|
| Lim Shun Qi | 50 m butterfly | 29.51 | 6 | Did not advance | |
| Lim Shun Qi | 100 m butterfly | 1:02.98 | 4 Q | 1:02.19 | 6 |
| Lim Shun Qi | 200 m butterfly | —N/a | | 2:18.48 | 8 |
| Lim Shun Qi | 50 m freestyle | —N/a | | Did not advance | |
| Lim Shun Qi | 100 m freestyle | 1:00.04 | 5 | Did not advance | |
| Ong Yong Qi | 100 m butterfly | 1:04.41 | 4 | Did not advance | |
| Ong Yong Qi | 200 m butterfly | —N/a | | 2:18.33 | 7 |
| Ong Yong Qi | 400 m individual medley | —N/a | | 5:04.20 | 5 |
| Loo Yie Bing | 50 m butterfly | 29.33 | 5 | Did not advance | |
| Loo Yie Bing | 50 m freestyle | 27.22 | 7 | Did not advance | |
| Loo Yie Bing | 100 m freestyle | 59.06 | 4 | Did not advance | |
| Loo Yie Bing | 200 m freestyle | 2:10.86 | 6 | Did not advance | |
| Kelly Teo Yao | 200 m freestyle | 2:07.98 | 3 Q | 2:07.43 | 7 |
| Kelly Teo Yao | 400 m freestyle | 4:35.50 | 4 Q | 4:32.15 | 6 |
| Kelly Teo Yao | 800 m freestyle | —N/a | | 9:20.77 | 6 |
| Kelly Teo Yao | 400 m individual medley | —N/a | | DNS | |
| Hooy Jia Yee | 400 m freestyle | 4:39.01 | 4 Q | 4:37.55 | 8 |
| Hooy Jia Yee | 800 m freestyle | —N/a | | 9:39.48 | 7 |
| Phee Jinq En | 50 m breaststroke | 32.91 | 2 Q | 31.94 | 3rd place, bronze medalist(s) |
| Phee Jinq En | 100 m breaststroke | 1:12.25 | 3 Q | 1:09.60 | 2nd place, silver medalist(s) |
| Phee Jinq En | 200 m breaststroke | —N/a | | Did not advance | |
| Chong Xin Lin | 50 m backstroke | 30.22 | 3 | 29.91 | 5 |
| Chong Xin Lin | 100 m backstroke | 1:05.31 | 4 | 1:05.17 | 6 |
| Chong Xin Lin | 200 m backstroke | 2:26.48 | 7 | Did not advance | |
| Tan Rou Xin | 200 m backstroke | 2:27.54 | 5 | Did not advance | |
| Tan Rou Xin | 50 m breaststroke | 33.41 | 4 Q | 33.48 | 7 |
| Tan Rou Xin | 100 m breaststroke | 1:13.29 | 4 | Did not advance | |
| Tan Rou Xin | 200 m breaststroke | —N/a | | 2:36.16 | 5 |
| Tan Rou Xin | 200 m individual medley | 2:22.77 | 4 Q | 2:22.18 | 8 |
| Tan Rou Xin; Loo Yie Bing; Lim Shun Qi; Kelly Teo Yao | 4x100 m freestyle relay | —N/a | | 3:57.93 | 5 |
| Loo Yie Bing; Lim Shun Qi; Kelly Teo Yao; Ong Yong Qi | 4x200 m freestyle relay | —N/a | | 8:41.49 | 6 |
| Kelly Teo Yao; Loo Yie Bing; Lim Shun Qi; Tan Rou Xin | 4x100 m medley relay | —N/a | | 3:57.93 | 5 |

Mixed

| Athlete | Event | Heats | | Final | |
| Athlete | Event | Time | Rank | Time | Rank |
|---|---|---|---|---|---|
| Andrew Goh Zheng Yen; Chong Xin Lin; Lim Shun Qi; Terence Ng Shin Jian | 4x100 m medley relay | —N/a | | 4:02.85 | 5 |

== Table tennis ==
Men

| Athlete | Event | Preliminary | | Round of 32 | Round of 16 | Quarterfinals | Semifinals | Finals | Rank |
| Athlete | Event | Opposition Score | Rank | Opposition Score | Opposition Score | Opposition Score | Opposition Score | Opposition Score | Rank |
|---|---|---|---|---|---|---|---|---|---|
| Leong Chee Feng | Singles | A Vongsa (LAO); W 3–1 | 1 Q | —N/a | | C Chew (SGP); W 4–2 | I Quek (SGP); L 1–4 | Did not advance | 3rd place, bronze medalist(s) |
| Leong Chee Feng | Singles | P Sanguansin (THA); W 3–1 | 1 Q | —N/a | | C Chew (SGP); W 4–2 | I Quek (SGP); L 1–4 | Did not advance | 3rd place, bronze medalist(s) |
| Leong Chee Feng | Singles | H N Annafi (INA); W 3–0 | 1 Q | —N/a | | C Chew (SGP); W 4–2 | I Quek (SGP); L 1–4 | Did not advance | 3rd place, bronze medalist(s) |
| Wong Qi Shen | Singles | Y Techsong (CAM); W 3–0 | 2 Q | —N/a | | I Quek (SGP); L 2–4 | Did not advance | | |
| Wong Qi Shen | Singles | N Đức Tuân (VIE); L 0–3 | 2 Q | —N/a | | I Quek (SGP); L 2–4 | Did not advance | | |
| Wong Qi Shen | Singles | J M M Nayre (PHI); L 2–3 | 2 Q | —N/a | | I Quek (SGP); L 2–4 | Did not advance | | |
| Brandon Fong Jay Shern; Danny Ng Wann Sing | Doubles | —N/a | | | S S Pring / S Tola (CAM); W 3–0 | J R P Misal / R P Gonzales (PHI); L 2–3 | Did not advance | | |
| Javen Choong; Wong Qi Shen | Doubles | —N/a | | | E I Valenet / J M M Nayre (PHI); W 3–0 | N Anh Tu / N Đức Tuân (VIE); W 3–1 | Beh Kun Ting / E P Shao Feng (SGP); W 3–1 | Pang Y E K / I Quek (SGP); L 3-1 | 2nd place, silver medalist(s) |

Women

| Athlete | Event | Preliminary | | Round of 32 | Round of 16 | Quarterfinals | Semifinals | Finals | Rank |
| Athlete | Event | Opposition Score | Rank | Opposition Score | Opposition Score | Opposition Score | Opposition Score | Opposition Score | Rank |
|---|---|---|---|---|---|---|---|---|---|
| Ho Ying | Singles | E R P Dael (PHI); L 1–3 | 1 Q | —N/a | | N K Diệu Khánh (VIE); L 3–4 | Did not advance | | |
| Ho Ying | Singles | Zhou Jy (SGP); W 3–0 | 1 Q | —N/a | | N K Diệu Khánh (VIE); L 3–4 | Did not advance | | |
| Ho Ying | Singles | N Widarahman (INA); W 3–0 | 1 Q | —N/a | | N K Diệu Khánh (VIE); L 3–4 | Did not advance | | |
| Alice Chang Li Sian | Singles | B Ngọc Lan (VIE); W 3–0 | 2 Q | —N/a | | S Sawettabut (THA); L 3–4 | Did not advance | | |
| Alice Chang Li Sian | Singles | J Zeng (SGP); L 0–3 | 2 Q | —N/a | | S Sawettabut (THA); L 3–4 | Did not advance | | |
| Alice Chang Li Sian | Singles | C M Annika (CAM); W 3–0 | 2 Q | —N/a | | S Sawettabut (THA); L 3–4 | Did not advance | | |
| Karen Lyne Dick; Tee Ai Xin | Doubles | —N/a | | | K Chendaroth / Y Chanrotana (CAM); W 3–0 | Ser L Q / Goh R X (SGP); L 0–3 | Did not advance | | |
| Alice Chang Li San; Im Li Ying | Doubles | —N/a | | | A J T Laude / E R P Dael (PHI); W 3–1 | T Mai Ngoc / N Thi Nga (VIE); W 3–0 | Zhou Jy / Wong X R (SGP); L 0–3 | Did not advance | 3rd place, bronze medalist(s) |

Mixed

| Athlete | Event | Round of 16 | Quarterfinals | Semifinals | Finals | Rank |
| Athlete | Event | Opposition Score | Opposition Score | Opposition Score | Opposition Score | Rank |
|---|---|---|---|---|---|---|
| Javen Choong; Karen Lyne Dick | Doubles | Bye | Đinh Anh Hoàng / T Mai Ngọc (VIE); L 2–3 | Did not advance | | |
| Ho Ying; Leong Chee Feng | Doubles | L Đình Đức / N Thị Nga (VIE); L 1–3 | Did not advance | | | |

Team

| Team | Event | Group Stage | | | Semifinals | Final | |
| Team | Event | Opposition Score | Opposition Score | Opposition Score | Opposition Score | Opposition Score | Rank |
|---|---|---|---|---|---|---|---|
| Leong Chee Feng; Wong Qi Shen; Javen Choong; Danny Ng Wann Sing; Brandon Fong Jay Shern | Men's team | Philippines (PHI); W 3-0 | Singapore (SGP); L 0-3 | Laos (LAO); W 3-0 | Vietnam (VIE); W 3-2 | Singapore (SGP); L 0-3 | 2nd place, silver medalist(s) |
| Alice Chang Li San; Ho Ying; Im Li Ying; Karen Lyne Dick; Tee Ai Xin | Women's team | Singapore (SGP); W 3-0 | Cambodia (CAM); W 3-0 | —N/a | Vietnam (VIE); W 3-1 | Thailand (THA); L 0-3 | 2nd place, silver medalist(s) |

== Taekwondo ==
Poomsae

| Athlete | Event | Final | |
| Athlete | Event | Score | Rank |
|---|---|---|---|
| Chin Ken Haw | Men's individual | 7.38 | 2nd place, silver medalist(s) |
| Cheong Chi Yap; Chin Ken Haw; Jason Loo Jun Wei | Men's team | 7.28 | 5 |
| Nur Humaira Abdul Karim | Women's individual | 7.43 | 1st place, gold medalist(s) |
| Lim Jia Wei; Nur Humaira Abdul Karim; Nur Hidayah Abdul Karim | Women's team | 7.70 | 2nd place, silver medalist(s) |
| Jason Loo Jun Wei; Nur Humaira Abdul Karim | Mixed pair | 7.55 | 1st place, gold medalist(s) |

Kyorugi

| Athlete | Event | Quarterfinal | Semifinal | Final | |
| Athlete | Event | Opposition Score | Opposition Score | Opposition Score | Rank |
|---|---|---|---|---|---|
| Sebastian Tan Chung Wan | Men's −54 kg | Louanghaksa (LAO); W 2–0 | R Sawekwiharee (THA); L 0–2 | Did not advance | 3rd place, bronze medalist(s) |
| Fu Cern Put Thai | Men's −58 kg | T Hafidz (INA); W 2–0 | S Youdeth (CAM); L 0–2 | Did not advance | 3rd place, bronze medalist(s) |
| Syafiq Zuber | Men's −80 kg | Bye | D G Cea (PHI); W 2–1 | O N Khairudin (INA); W 2–1 | 1st place, gold medalist(s) |
| Luqman Haqim Suhaimi | Men's −87 kg | —N/a | S Barias (PHI); L 1–2 | Did not advance | 3rd place, bronze medalist(s) |

== Tennis ==
Men

| Athlete | Event | Round of 16 | Quarterfinals | Semifinals | Final | |
| Athlete | Event | Opposition Score | Opposition Score | Opposition Score | Opposition Score | Rank |
|---|---|---|---|---|---|---|
| Koay Hao Sheng | Singles | Y Charoenphon (THA); W 7–6, 6–1 | B Kenny (CAM); L 6–4, 2–6, 1–6 | Did not advance | | |
| Mitsuki Leong Wei Keng | Singles | S Simmalavong (LAO); W 6–2, 6–0 | K Samrej (THA); L 2–6, 3–6 | Did not advance | | |
| Koay Hao Sheng; Mitsuki Leong Wei Keng | Doubles | V Rasavady / S Songbandith (LAO); W 6–1, 6–2 | P Isaro / T Suksumrarn (THA); W 3–6, 6–4, [10-7] | C Rungkat / N Barki (INA); L 2–6, 6–7 | Did not advance | 3rd place, bronze medalist(s) |
| Darrshan Suresh; Imran Daniel Abd Hazli | Doubles | D Susanto / I Susanto (INA); L 5–7, 6–4, [5-10] | Did not advance | | | |
| Koay Hao Sheng; Christian Andre Liew Sheng; Mitsuki Leong Wei Kang | Team | —N/a | Cambodia; W 2–1 | Thailand; L 0–2 | Did not advance | 3rd place, bronze medalist(s) |

Women

| Athlete | Event | Round of 16 | Quarterfinals | Semifinals | Final | |
| Athlete | Event | Opposition Score | Opposition Score | Opposition Score | Opposition Score | Rank |
|---|---|---|---|---|---|---|
| Shihomi Leong Li Xuan; Zenn Lim Sze Xuan | Doubles | B Gumulya / F Sabrina (INA); L 2–6, 1–6 | Did not advance | | | |
| Shihomi Leong Li Xuan; Zenn Lim Sze Xuan | Team | —N/a | Thailand; L 0–2 | Did not advance | | |

Mixed

| Athlete | Event | Round of 16 | Quarterfinals | Semifinals | Final | |
| Athlete | Event | Opposition Score | Opposition Score | Opposition Score | Opposition Score | Rank |
|---|---|---|---|---|---|---|
| Hao Sheng Koay; Shihomi Leong Li Xuan | Doubles | Thire Z / Zin B (MYA); W 6–3, 6–0 | L Kumkhum / T Suksumrarn (THA); L 0–6, 0–6 | Did not advance | | |
| Darrshan Suresh; Zenn Lim Sze Xuan | Doubles | G Krusling / M Krusling (CAM); W 7–6, 3–0^{r} | P Plipuech / P Isaro (THA); L 4–6, 2–6 | Did not advance | | |

== Teqball (demonstration) ==
As a demonstration sport, medals won in teqball will not count towards Malaysia's official medal tally.

Men

| Athlete | Event | Group Stage | | | | Semifinals | Final / BM | Rank |
| Athlete | Event | Opposition Score | Opposition Score | Opposition Score | Rank | Opposition Score | Opposition Score | Rank |
|---|---|---|---|---|---|---|---|---|
| Al Barilan Shahul Hameed | Singles | H Sambo (CAM); W 2–0 | Y Putra (INA); L 1–2 | Farhan (SGP); L 1–2 | 2 Q | R Sokphirom (CAM); L 0–2 | M Arguilles (PHI); W 2–0 | 3rd place, bronze medalist(s) |
| Hanifah Abdul Wahid; Mustaqim Zainordin | Doubles | B Thuonvireak / O Ravy (CAM); L 0–2 | F Semillano / M Fuentes (PHI); W 2–1 | P Dejaroe / U Kukheaw (THA); L 0–2 | 3 | Did not advance | | |

Women

| Athlete | Event | Group Stage | | | | | Semifinals | Final / BM | Rank |
| Athlete | Event | Opposition Score | Opposition Score | Opposition Score | Opposition Score | Rank | Opposition Score | Opposition Score | Rank |
|---|---|---|---|---|---|---|---|---|---|
| Siti Asnidah Zamri | Singles | P Sopha (CAM); W 2–0 | N Chanboramey (CAM); W 2–0 | Yunita I (INA); W 2–1 | Sharifah (SGP); L 0–2 | 2 Q | Yunita I (INA); L 1–2 | N Chanboramey (CAM); W 2–0 | 3rd place, bronze medalist(s) |

== Traditional boat race ==
Men

| Team | Event | Round 1 | | Round 2 | | Total Time | Rank |
| Team | Event | Time | Rank | Time | Rank | Total Time | Rank |
|---|---|---|---|---|---|---|---|
| Ahmad Ariff Rasydan; Ahmad Nuqman Hadi Ayob; Khairul Naim Zainal; Mirza Adli Shaharaziz; Fahmi Izwan Shahril; Montoya Raw Michael; Muhammad Fakhrullah | 5 crews (U24) 250 m | 1:41.136 | 4 | 1:30.081 | 4 | 3:11.217 | 4 |
| Ahmad Ariff Rasydan; Ahmad Nuqman Hadi Ayob; Khairul Naim Zainal; Mirza Adli Shaharaziz; Fahmi Izwan Shahril; Montoya Raw Michael; Muhammad Fakhrullah | 5 crews (U24) 500 m | DNS | — | DNS | — | DNS | — |
| Ahmad Amir Zainalabadlin; Ahmad Ariff Rasydan; Nuqman Hadi Ayob; Khairul Naim Zainal; Mirza Adli Shaharaziz; Fahmi Izwan Shahril; Montoya Raw Michael; Muhammad Fakhrullah; Muhd Aiman Zamberi; Bahij Rabbani; Muhammad Nur Rahman; Ridzuan Abdul Aziz; Shahrin Haziq; Nik Afiq Nik Mazli | | | | | | | |
| Ahmad Amir Zainalabadlin; Ahmad Ariff Rasydan; Nuqman Hadi Ayob; Khairul Naim Zainal; Mirza Adli Shaharaziz; Fahmi Izwan Shahril; Montoya Raw Michael; Muhammad Fakhrullah; Muhd Aiman Zamberi; Bahij Rabbani; Muhammad Nur Rahman; Ridzuan Abdul Aziz; Shahrin Haziq; Nik Afiq Nik Mazli | 12 crews (U24) 250 m | 2:11.711 | 3 | 2:08.944 | 1 Q | 2:17.449 | 5 |
| Ahmad Amir Zainalabadlin; Ahmad Ariff Rasydan; Nuqman Hadi Ayob; Khairul Naim Zainal; Mirza Adli Shaharaziz; Fahmi Izwan Shahril; Montoya Raw Michael; Muhammad Fakhrullah; Muhd Aiman Zamberi; Bahij Rabbani; Muhammad Nur Rahman; Ridzuan Abdul Aziz; Shahrin Haziq; Nik Afiq Nik Mazli | 12 crews (U24) 800 m | 3:35.733 | 2 | 3:49.460 | 4 | 7:25.193 | 3rd place, bronze medalist(s) |
| Ahmad Amir Zainalabadlin; Ahmad Ariff Rasydan; Nuqman Hadi Ayob; Khairul Naim Zainal; Mirza Adli Shaharaziz; Fahmi Izwan Shahril; Montoya Raw Michael; Muhammad Fakhrullah; Muhd Aiman Zamberi; Bahij Rabbani; Muhammad Nur Rahman; Ridzuan Abdul Aziz; Shahrin Haziq; Nik Afiq Nik Mazli | 12 crews (open) 250 m | 1:04.974 | 3 | 1:04.571 | 2 | 2:09.545 | 2nd place, silver medalist(s) |

Women

| Team | Event | Round 1 | | Round 2 | | Total Time | Rank |
| Team | Event | Time | Rank | Time | Rank | Total Time | Rank |
|---|---|---|---|---|---|---|---|
| Farah Zulaikha Tokiman; Nur Amirah Anisah Abd Kadir; Nur Atasha Nabila Saring; Nur Syahirah Fuad; Nurul Najieha Zulkifli; Siti Nurul Masyitah Md Elias | 3 crews (U24) 250 m | 2:08.850 | 3 | 2:17.178 | 3 | 4:26.026 | 3rd place, bronze medalist(s) |

Mixed

| Team | Event | Round 1 | | Round 2 | | Total Time | Rank |
| Team | Event | Time | Rank | Time | Rank | Total Time | Rank |
|---|---|---|---|---|---|---|---|
| Ahmad Amir Zainalabadlin; Ahmad Ariff Rasydan; Nuqman Hadi Ayob; Khairul Naim Zainal; Mirza Adli Shaharaziz; Fahmi Izwan Shahril; Montoya Raw Michael; Muhammad Fakhrullah; Muhammad Nur Rahman; Farah Zulaikha Tokiman; Nur Amirah Anisah Abd Kadir; Nur Atasha Nabila Saring; Nur Syahirah Fuad; Nurul Najieha Zulkifli | 12 crews (U24) 500 m | 2:16.179 | 4 | 2:18.072 | 4 | 4:34.251 | 4 |
| Ahmad Amir Zainalabadlin; Ahmad Ariff Rasydan; Nuqman Hadi Ayob; Khairul Naim Zainal; Mirza Adli Shaharaziz; Fahmi Izwan Shahril; Montoya Raw Michael; Muhammad Fakhrullah; Muhammad Nur Rahman; Farah Zulaikha Tokiman; Nur Amirah Anisah Abd Kadir; Nur Atasha Nabila Saring; Nur Syahirah Fuad; Nurul Najieha Zulkifli | 12 crews (U24) 800 m | DNS | — | DNS | — | DNS | — |

== Volleyball ==
=== Beach ===
| Team | Event | Preliminary round | | | | Semifinals | Finals / BM | |
| Team | Event | Opposition Score | Opposition Score | Opposition Score | Rank | Opposition Score | Opposition Score | Rank |
|---|---|---|---|---|---|---|---|---|
| Low Jeng Yih; Muhammad Ilham Adili Alias; Ler Wei Chun; Looi Kai Xu | Men's tournament | Singapore; L 1-2 | Thailand; W 2-0 | Indonesia; L 0-2 | 3 | Did not advance | | |
| Maegan Beh Jia Yan; Zuliza Pilihan; Nur Auni Maisarah Shamsulrizal; Sin Sing Yee | Women's tournament | Vietnam; L 0-2 | Philippines; L 0-2 | Thailand; L 0-2 | 4 | Did not advance | | |

=== Indoor ===
| Team | Event | Preliminary round | | | | Semifinals | Finals / BM / CM | |
| Team | Event | Opposition Score | Opposition Score | Opposition Score | Rank | Opposition Score | Opposition Score | Rank |
|---|---|---|---|---|---|---|---|---|
| Malaysia Men's | Men's tournament | Thailand; L 0–3 | Myanmar; W 3-1 | Vietnam; L 0–3 | 3 QC | Philippines; L 2-3 | Myanmar; L 2-3 | 8 |
| Malaysia Women's | Women's tournament | Myanmar; W 3-0 | Indonesia; L 0-3 | Thailand; L 0-3 | 3 QC | Cambodia; W 3-0 | Singapore; L 2-3 | 6 |

== Water polo ==
| Team | Event | Round Robin | | | | | |
| Team | Event | Opposition Score | Opposition Score | Opposition Score | Opposition Score | Opposition Score | Rank |
|---|---|---|---|---|---|---|---|
| Jason Ng Yew Soon; Khiew Tze Yean; Wong Chee Ching; Chai Chuan Ze; Lee Jia Chen; Yeap Zhi Wen Ivan; Mohd Irshad Syahir Abd Halim; Tan Yi Ming; Yap Tin How; Lai Wenhang; Abraham Jesaiah Chin Jin Yuen; Saw Wei Er; Julian Lim Kah Wern | Men's tournament | Philippines; L 4–15 | Singapore; L 1–14 | Thailand; L 4–19 | Cambodia; W 21–12 | Indonesia; L 6–14 | 5 |

== Weightlifting ==
Malaysia initially sent five weightlifters (three male and two female) to participate in the games. However, Hafiz Shamsuddin had to withdraw due to a left shoulder injury.

Men

| Athlete | Event | Snatch | Clean & Jerk | Total | Rank |
|---|---|---|---|---|---|
| Daniel Dahlan | 67 kg | 128 | — | 128 | DNF |
| Erry Hidayat | 73 kg | — | — | — | DNF |

Women

| Athlete | Event | Snatch | Clean & Jerk | Total | Rank |
|---|---|---|---|---|---|
| Nur Atikah Mahamad Sobri | 59 kg | 85 | 100 | 185 | 6 |
| Nur Syazwani Radzi | 64 kg | 80 | 104 | 184 | 3rd place, bronze medalist(s) |

== Wushu ==
Taolu

| Athlete | Event | Final | |
| Athlete | Event | Score | Rank |
|---|---|---|---|
| Calvin Lee Wai Leong | Men's nanquan | 9.513 | 4 |
| Calvin Lee Wai Leong | Men's nandao + nangun | 18.746 | 7 |
| Clement Ting Su Wei | Men's changquan | 9.596 | 4 |
| Clement Ting Su Wei | Men's daoshu + gunshu | 19.046 | 8 |
| Tan Zhi Yan | Men's taijiquan + taijijian | 18.940 | 3rd place, bronze medalist(s) |
| Wong Weng Son | Men's changquan | 9.666 | 3rd place, bronze medalist(s) |
| Wong Weng Son | Men's jianshu + qianshu | 19.103 | 2nd place, silver medalist(s) |
| Calvin Lee Wai Leong; Clement Ting Su Wei; Wong Weng Son | Men's duilian | 9.140 | 8 |
| Loh Ying Ting | Women's changquan | 9.533 | 6 |
| Loh Ying Ting | Women's daoshu + gunshu | 18.606 | 4 |
| Pang Pui Yee | Women's changquan | 9.643 | 3rd place, bronze medalist(s) |
| Pang Pui Yee | Women's jianshu + qianshu | 18.246 | 3rd place, bronze medalist(s) |
| Tan Cheong Min | Women's nanquan | 9.626 | 1st place, gold medalist(s) |
| Tan Cheong Min | Women's nandao + nangun | 19.16 | 1st place, gold medalist(s) |
| Sydney Chin Sy Xuan | Women's taijiquan + taijijian | 19.196 | 2nd place, silver medalist(s) |
| Loh Ying Ting; Pang Pui Yee; Tan Cheong Min | Women's duilian | 9.290 | 5 |

Sanda

| Athlete | Event | Quarterfinals | Semifinals | Final | |
| Athlete | Event | Opposition Score | Opposition Score | Opposition Score | Rank |
|---|---|---|---|---|---|
| Samuel Yeo Boon Leng | Men's sanda -60 kg | M S Soursdey (CAM); W 2–0 | G F P Wayan (PHI); L 0–2 | Did not advance | 3rd place, bronze medalist(s) |
| Usamah Mohd Azhar | Men's sanda -65 kg | C Kamolklang (THA); L 0–2 | Did not advance | | |
| Vicky Hwa Chang | Men's sanda -70 kg | —N/a | Đ Văn Bí (VIE); L 0–2 | Did not advance | 3rd place, bronze medalist(s) |

== Xiangqi ==
Men

| Athlete | Event | Round Robin | | | | | |
| Athlete | Event | Round 1 | Round 2 | Round 3 | Round 4 | Round 5 | Rank |
| Athlete | Event | Opposition Score | Opposition Score | Opposition Score | Opposition Score | Opposition Score | Rank |
|---|---|---|---|---|---|---|---|
| Sim Yip How | Standard Single | Chiu Y K (CAM); D 1–1 | Chan K O (CAM); L 0–2 | J Gomez (PHI); W 2–0 | Ng J (SGP); W 2–0 | L Lý Huynh (VIE); L 0–2 | 7 |
| Fang Sze Jie | Standard Single | L Lý Huynh (VIE); L 0–2 | R Lokutarapol (THA); L 0–2 | Ng J (SGP); L 0–2 | V Pornvoranunt (THA); L 0–2 | Chan K O (CAM); D 1–1 | 8 |
| Sim Yip How; Yeoh Thean Jern | Blitz Team | T Danwirunhawanich / P Panichkul (THA); W 2–0 | H Chamnan / Chan K O (CAM); W 2–0 | H Văn Tiến / C Tuấn Hải (VIE); W 2–0 | G Jan / B Sales (PHI); W 2–0 | Low Y H / Alvin W (SGP); L 0–2 | 3rd place, bronze medalist(s) |
| Tan Yu Huat; Yeoh Thean Jern | Rapid Team | Low Y H / Ng J (SGP); W 2–0 | N Quang Nhật / Đ C Tùng Lân (VIE); D 1–1 | P Panichkul / T Danwirunhawanich (THA); W 2–0 | J Gomez / A Abundo (PHI); W 2–0 | Chiu Y K / H Chamnan (CAM); D 1–1 | 2nd place, silver medalist(s) |

Women

| Athlete | Event | Round Robin | | | | | |
| Athlete | Event | Round 1 | Round 2 | Round 3 | Round 4 | Round 5 | Rank |
| Athlete | Event | Opposition Score | Opposition Score | Opposition Score | Opposition Score | Opposition Score | Rank |
|---|---|---|---|---|---|---|---|
| Jee Xin Ru | Standard Single | L T Kim Loan (VIE); D 1–1 | Lan H (SGP); D 1–1 | N Srivachirawat (THA); W 2–0 | F Tan (SGP); D 1–1 | V Ang (MAS); W 2–0 | 3rd place, bronze medalist(s) |
| Vespera Ang Cheng Wuey | Standard Single | M Moralde (PHI); W 2–0 | Đ T Thùy Dung (VIE); W 2–0 | F Tan (SGP); L 0–2 | L T Kim Loan (VIE); L 0–2 | Jee X R (MAS); L 0–2 | 4 |
