= Cycling at the 2023 SEA Games – Women's cross country =

Cycling – Women's cross country at the 2023 SEA Games
- Venue: Siem Reap
- Dates: 6 May 2023
- Competitors: 18 from 6 nations

Medalists
gold medal	Sayu Bella Sukma Dewi	Indonesia
silver medal	Nur Assyria Zainal Abidin	Malaysia
bronze medal	Yonthanan Phonkla	Thailand

The women's cross country mountain biking cycling event at the 2023 SEA Games took place on 6 May 2022, at Siem Reap, Cambodia. 18 riders from 6 nations competed in the event.

== Results ==
Rank	Rider	Time
1st place, gold medalist(s)	Sayu Bella Sukma Dewi (INA)	1:13:48
2nd place, silver medalist(s)	Nur Assyria Zainal Abidin (MAS)	1:17:09
3rd place, bronze medalist(s)	Yonthanan Phonkla (THA)	1:18:42
4	Ariana Thea Patrice Evangelista Dormitorio (PHI)	1:20:30
5	Dela Anjar Wulan (INA)	1:21:27
6	Supuksorn Nuntana (THA)	1:23:42
7	Jarinya Suebjakthin (THA)	1:24:03
8	Phi Kun Pan (MAS)	1:24:37
9	Shagne Paula Hermosilla Yaoyao (PHI)	1:24:51
10	Natahsya Soon (MAS)	1:26:42
11	Thi Thom Ca (VIE)	1:26:59
12	Khen Malai (CAM)	-1 LAP
13	Nicole bejo Quinones (PHI)	-1 LAP
14	Thi Hue Bui (VIE)	-1 LAP
15	Yoath Kanika (CAM)	-2 LAP
16	Von Sreynith (CAM)	-2 LAP
17	Dara Latifah (THA)	DNF
18	Thi Nhu Quynh Dinh (VIE)	DNF
