= Cycling at the 2023 SEA Games – Women's elimination =

Cycling – Women's elimination at the 2023 SEA Games
- Venue: Siem Reap
- Dates: 8 May 2023
- Competitors: 12 from 6 nations

Medalists
gold medal	Dara Latifah	Indonesia
silver medal	Ariana Thea Patrice Evangelista	Philippines
bronze medal	Warinthorn Phetpraphan	Thailand

The women's elimination mountain biking cycling event at the 2023 SEA Games took place on 8 May 2022, at Siem Reap, Cambodia. 12 riders from 6 different nations, 2 riders from each nation, competed in the event.

== Results ==
=== Qualification ===
Rank	Rider	Time
1	Warinthorn Phetpraphan (THA)	1:22.480
2	Vipavee Deekaballes (THA)	1:22.594
3	Ariana Thea Patrice Evangelista (PHI)	1:28.542
4	Nur Assyria Zainal Abidin (MAS)	1:30.249
5	Dara Latifah (INA)	1:30.750
6	Phi Kun Pan (MAS)	1:31.379
7	Khen Malai (CAM)	1:31.572
8	Thi Soan Quang (VIE)	1:31.773
9	Thi Nhu Quynh Dinh (VIE)	1:36.747
10	Yoath Kanika (CAM)	1:43.546
11	Naomi Mapanao Gardoce (PHI)	1:53.269
12	Sayu Bella Sukma Dewi (INA)	2:00.455

=== Elimination Heats ===
Heat 1

Rank	Rider	Notes
1	Warinthorn Phetpraphan (THA)	Q
2	Thi Soan Quang (VIE)	Q
3	Thi Nhu Quynh Dinh (VIE)	

Heat 2

Rank	Rider	Notes
1	Dara Latifah (INA)	Q
2	Nur Assyria Zainal Abidin (MAS)	Q
3	NSayu Bella Sukma Dewi (INA)	DNS

Heat 3

Rank	Rider	Notes
1	Vipavee Deekaballes (THA)	Q
2	Khen Malai (CAM)	Q
3	Yoath Kanika (CAM)	

Heat 4

Rank	Rider	Notes
1	Ariana Thea Patrice Evangelista (PHI)	Q
2	Phi Kun Pan (MAS)	Q
3	Naomi Mapanao Gardoce (PHI)	

=== Semifinals ===
Heat 1

Rank	Rider	Notes
1	Warinthorn Phetpraphan (THA)	BF
2	Dara Latifah (INA)	BF
3	Nur Assyria Zainal Abidin (MAS)	SF
4	Thi Soan Quang (VIE)	SF

Heat 2

Rank	Rider	Notes
1	Ariana Thea Patrice Evangelista (PHI)	BF
2	Vipavee Deekaballes (THA)	BF
3	Khen Malai (CAM)	SF
4	Phi Kun Pan (MAS)	SF

=== Finals ===
Big Finals

Rank	Rider	Notes
1st place, gold medalist(s)	Dara Latifah (INA)	
2nd place, silver medalist(s)	Ariana Thea Patrice Evangelista (PHI)	
3rd place, bronze medalist(s)	Warinthorn Phetpraphan (THA)	
4	Vipavee Deekaballes (THA)	

Small Finals

Rank	Rider	Notes
5	Thi Soan Quang (VIE)	
6	RKhen Malai (CAM)	
7	Phi Kun Pan (MAS)	
8	Nur Assyria Zainal Abidin (MAS)	
