= Cycling at the 2023 SEA Games – Men's elimination =

Cycling – Men's elimination at the 2023 SEA Games
- Venue: Siem Reap
- Dates: 8 May 2023
- Competitors: 14 from 8 nations

Medalists
gold medal	Methasit Boonsane	Thailand
silver medal	Khim Menglong	Cambodia
bronze medal	Ihza Muhammad	Indonesia

The men's elimination mountain biking cycling event at the 2023 SEA Games took place on8 May 2022, at Siem Reap, Cambodia. 14 riders from 8 different nations competed in the event.

== Results ==
=== Qualification ===
Rank	Rider	Time
1	Methasit Boonsane (THA)	1:10.298
2	Riyadh Hakim Bin Lukman (SGP)	1:10.357
3	Phunsiri Sirimongkhon (THA)	1:11.487
4	Khim Menglong (CAM)	1:12.122
5	Mark Louwel Antonio Valderama (PHI)	1:12.286
6	Zulfikri Zulkifli (MAS)	1:12.731
7	Eleazar Tia Barba (PHI)	1:13.418
8	Zaenal Fanani (INA)	1:13.636
9	Muhammad Syawal Mazlin (MAS)	1:14.618
10	Ihza Muhammad (INA)	1:16.237
11	Chhan Chhayfong (CAM)	1:16.248
12	Joao Bosco Ximenes (TLS)	1:18.604
13	Nguyen Van Lam (VIE)	1:21.127
14	Dinh Van Linh (VIE)	1:22.338

=== Elimination Heats ===
Heat 1

Rank	Rider	Notes
1	Methasit Boonsane (THA)	Q
2	Muhammad Syawal Mazlin (MAS)	Q
3	Zaenal Fanani (INA)	

Heat 2

Rank	Rider	Notes
1	Mark Louwel Antonio Valderama (PHI)	Q
2	Khim Menglong (CAM)	Q
3	Nguyen Van Lam (VIE)	
4	Joao Bosco Ximenes (TLS)	

Heat 3

Rank	Rider	Notes
1	Riyadh Hakim Bin Lukman (SGP)	Q
2	Ihza Muhammad (INA)	Q
3	Eleazar Tia Barba (PHI)	

Heat 4

Rank	Rider	Notes
1	Zulfikri Zulkifli (MAS)	Q
2	Phunsiri Sirimongkhon (THA)	Q
3	Chhan Chhayfong (CAM)	
4	Dinh Van Linh (VIE)	

=== Semifinals ===
Heat 1

Rank	Rider	Notes
1	Methasit Boonsane (THA)	BF
2	Khim Menglong (CAM)	BF
3	Mark Louwel Antonio Valderama (PHI)	SF
4	Muhammad Syawal Mazlin (MAS)	SF

Heat 2

Rank	Rider	Notes
1	Zulfikri Zulkifli (MAS)	BF
2	Ihza Muhammad (INA)	BF
3	Phunsiri Sirimongkhon (THA)	SF
4	Riyadh Hakim Bin Lukman (SGP)	SF

=== Finals ===
Big Finals

Rank	Rider	Notes
1st place, gold medalist(s)	Methasit Boonsane (THA)	
2nd place, silver medalist(s)	Khim Menglong (CAM)	
3rd place, bronze medalist(s)	Ihza Muhammad (INA)	
4	Zulfikri Zulkifli (MAS)	

Small Finals

Rank	Rider	Notes
5	Muhammad Syawal Mazlin (MAS)	
6	Riyadh Hakim Bin Lukman (SGP)	
7	Phunsiri Sirimongkhon (THA)	
8	Mark Louwel Antonio Valderama (PHI)	
