= Cycling at the 2023 SEA Games – Mixed cross country relay =

Cycling – Mixed cross country relay at the 2023 SEA Games
- Venue: Siem Reap
- Dates: 7 May 2023
- Competitors: 22 from 6 nations

Medalists
gold medal	Dara Latifah; Feri Yudoyono; Sayu Bella Sukma Dewi; Zaenal Fanani	Indonesia
silver medal	Keerati Sukprasart; Phunsiri Sirimongkhon; Supuksorn Nuntana; Warinthorn Phetpraphan	Thailand
bronze medal	Ariana Thea Patrice Evangelista; Edmhel John Rivera Flores; Jerico Cruz Rivera; Shagne Paula Hermosilla Yaoyao	Philippines

The mixed cross country relay mountain biking cycling event at the 2023 Southeast Asian Games took place on 7 May 2022, at Siem Reap, Cambodia. 22 riders from 6 different nations competed in the event.

== Results ==
Rank	Rider	Time
1st place, gold medalist(s)	Indonesia; Dara Latifah; Feri Yudoyono; Sayu Bella Sukma Dewi; Zaenal Fanani	50:11
2nd place, silver medalist(s)	Thailand; Keerati Sukprasart; Phunsiri Sirimongkhon; Supuksorn Nuntana; Warinthorn Phetpraphan	51:44
3rd place, bronze medalist(s)	Philippines; Ariana Thea Patrice Evangelista; Edmhel John Rivera Flores; Jerico Cruz Rivera; Shagne Paula Hermosilla Yaoyao	52:25
4	Malaysia; Ahmad Syazrin Awang Ilah; Nur Assyira Zainal Abidin; Natahsya Soon; Zulfikri Zulkifli	53:21
5	Vietnam; Thi Soan Quang; Thi Nhu Quynh Dinh; Van Linh Dinh; Van Nhat Bui	54:43
6	Cambodia; Chhan Chhayfong; Khen Malai; Khim Menglong; Yoath Kanika	55:16
