= Traditional boat race at the 2023 SEA Games =

- Venue: Aquatic Sport Center
- Location: Kampot, Cambodia
- Dates: 13–16 May 2023

The traditional boat racing competitions at the 2023 SEA Games in Cambodia were held at Aquatic Sport Center, Kampot from 13–16 May 2023.

== Medal table ==
* Host nation (Cambodia)

Rank	Nation	Gold	Silver	Bronze	Total
1	Thailand	4	3	1	8
2	Indonesia	3	1	4	8
3	Vietnam	3	1	0	4
4	Cambodia*	2	2	4	8
5	Myanmar	1	5	2	8
6	Malaysia	0	1	2	3
Totals (6 entries)		13	13	13	39

== Medalists ==
Event	Gold	Silver	Bronze
Men's 5 crews (U24) 250 m	Myanmar; Khant Zaw Aung; Myat Min Tun; Myo Hlaing Win; Pyae Sone Aung; Saw Naing Lin Kyaw; Thet Paing Phyo; Tin Ko Ko	Cambodia; Horl Dale; La Soknim; Ly Mouslim; Ok Mathel; Phorn Sophean; San Makara; Vutha Ratana	Thailand; Preecha Chanpa; Natthapon Kreepkamrai; Saharat Pholpikun; Sukrit Rakkarn; Phatthara Sangdet; Theerapong Wonginta
Men's 5 crews (U24) 500 m	Cambodia; Horl Dale; La Soknim; Ly Mouslim; Ok Mathel; Phorn Sophean; San Makara; Vutha Ratana	Thailand; Preecha Chanpa; Teerasak Chuden; Pitpiboon Mahawattanangkul; Photsawat Nachaikhong; Suttiphong Ngamkrabuan; Chetsadaporn Simma; Mongkhonchai Sisong	Indonesia; Dapit; Dede Sunandar; Muh Burhan; Rudiansyah; Subhi; Wandi; Zubakri
Men's 5 crews (U24) 800 m	Cambodia; Horl Dale; La Soknim; Ly Mouslim; Ok Mathel; Phorn Sophean; San Makara; Vutha Ratana	Myanmar; Khant Zaw Aung; Myo Swe; Pyae Sone Aung; Saw Naing Lin Kyaw; Thet Paing Phyo; Tin Ko Ko	Indonesia; Abdul Hamid; Dede Sunandar; Irwan; Lukman Nulhakim; Muh Burhan; Rapik Saputra; Wandi
Men's 12 crews (U24) 250 m	Indonesia; Abdul Hamid; Dapit; Dede Sunandar; Indra Hidayat; Irwan; Lukman Nulhakim; Muh Burhan; Rapik Saputra; Rudiansyah; Subhi; Wandi; Zubakri	Vietnam; Châu Đại Dương; Hiên Năm; Hoàng Văn Vương; Nguyễn Xuân Sang; Nguyễn Văn Cường; Nguyễn Văn Viết; Phạm Hồng Quân; Phạm Lương Tú; Tạ Minh Đác Uynh; Trần Thành Cường; Trần Tường Khang; Trương Xuân Nguyên; Võ Hùng Thái; Vũ Đình Linh	Cambodia; Cheat Nisith; Choub Seiha; Chov Somrach; Horl Dale; La Soknim; Ly Mouslim; Mon Sereyvuht; Phorn Sophean; Rith Vandy; San Makara; Sothea Lyhieng; Vorn Phanet; Vutha Ratana
Men's 12 crews (U24) 500 m	Thailand; Preecha Chanpa; Teerasak Chuden; Natthapon Kreepkamrai; Pitpiboon Mahawattanangkul; Photsawat Nachaikhong; Suttiphong Ngamkrabuan; Saharat Pholpikun; Sukrit Rakkarn; Phatthara Sangdet; Chetsadaporn Simma; Mongkhonchai Sisong; Theerapong Wonginta	Indonesia; Abdul Hamid; Dapit; Dede Sunandar; Indra Hidayat; Irwan; Lukman Nulhakim; Muh Burhan; Rapik Saputra; Rudiansyah; Subhi; Wandi; Zubakri	Myanmar; Aung Phyo Hein; Khant Zaw Aung; Min Thu Hein; Myat Min Tun; Myo Hlaing Win; Myo Swe; Pyae Phyo Thant; Pyae Sone Aung; Saw Kaung Kaung San; Saw Naing Lin Kyaw; Thet Naing Phyo; Thet Paing Phyo; Tin Ko Ko; Zaw Zaw Tun
Men's 12 crews (U24) 800 m	Thailand; Preecha Chanpa; Teerasak Chuden; Natthapon Kreepkamrai; Pitpiboon Mahawattanangkul; Photsawat Nachaikhong; Suttiphong Ngamkrabuan; Saharat Pholpikun; Sukrit Rakkarn; Phatthara Sangdet; Chetsadaporn Simma; Mongkhonchai Sisong; Theerapong Wonginta	Myanmar; Aung Phyo Hein; Hein Soe; Khant Zaw Aung; Myat Min Tun; Myo Hlaing Win; Myo Swe; Pyae Phyo Thant; Pyae Sone Aung; Saw Kaung Kaung San; Saw Naing Lin Kyaw; Shine Wai Lin; Thet Paing Phyo; Tin Ko Ko; Zaw Zaw Tun	Malaysia; Ahmad Amir Khan; Ahmad Ariff Rasydan; Ahmad Nuqman Hadi Ayob; Khairul Naim Zainal; Mirza Adli Shaharaziz; Mohd Fahmi Izwan Shahril; Montoya Raw Michael; Muhd Fakhrullah; Muhd Aiman Zamberi; Muhd Bahij Rabbani; Muhd Nur Rahman; Muhd Ridzuan Abdul Aziz; Muhd Shahrin Haziq; Nik Afiq Nik Mazli
Men's 12 crews (open) 250 m	Thailand; Sukon Boon-em; Kasemsit Borriboonwasin; Suradet Faengnoi; Panlop Jeenchai; Nattapon Kaewsri; Natthapon Kreepkamrai; Pornprom Kramsuk; Suwan Kwanthong; Watchara Muangkum; Phatthara Sangdet; Somchai Sangmuang; Chitsanupong Sangpan; Nopphadol Sangthuang; Phakdee Wannamanee	Malaysia; Ahmad Amir Khan; Ahmad Ariff Rasydan; Ahmad Nuqman Hadi Ayob; Khairul Naim Zainal; Mirza Adli Shaharaziz; Mohd Fahmi Izwan Shahril; Montoya Raw Michael; Muhd Fakhrullah; Muhd Aiman Zamberi; Muhd Bahij Rabbani; Muhd Nur Rahman; Muhd Ridzuan Abdul Aziz; Muhd Shahrin Haziq; Nik Afiq Nik Mazli	Cambodia; Cheat Nisith; Choub Seiha; Chov Somrach; Horl Lyda; Koem Som; Leng Sothea; Ly Torhieth; Meas Sam Oun; Meas Sinat; Rith Disco; Ron Pherou; Sin Visal; Sothea Lyhieng; Vantha Sakonin
Men's 12 crews (open) 500 m	Indonesia; Abdur Rahim; Andri Agus Mulyana; Anwar Tarra; Harjuna; Indra Hidayat; Indra Tri Setiawan; Joko Andriyanto; Maizir Riyondra; Mugi Harjito; Muhammad Yunus Rustandi; Rudiansyah; Sutrisno; Tri Wahyu Buwono; Yuda Firmansyah	Thailand; Sukon Boon-em; Kasemsit Borriboonwasin; Suradet Faengnoi; Panlop Jeenchai; Nattapon Kaewsri; Pornprom Kramsuk; Natthapon Kreepkamrai; Suwan Kwanthong; Watchara Muangkum; Phatthara Sangdet; Somchai Sangmuang; Chitsanupong Sangpan; Nopphadol Sangthuang; Phakdee Wannamanee	Myanmar; Aung Phyo Hein; Hein Soe; Htoo Htoo Aung; Khant Zaw Aung; Min Thu Hein; Myint Ko Ko; Naing Lin Oo; Saw Moe Aung; Shine Wai Lin; Than Htay Aung; Thant Zin Oo; Thet Naing Phyo; Yu Ya Maung; Zin Ko Htet
Men's 12 crews (open) 800 m	Indonesia; Abdur Rahim; Andri Agus Mulyana; Anwar Tarra; Harjuna; Indra Tri Setiawan; Joko Andriyanto; Maizir Riyondra; Mugi Harjito; Muhammad Yunus Rustandi; Sutrisno; Tri Wahyu Buwono; Yuda Firmansyah	Myanmar; Aung Phyo Hein; Hein Soe; Htoo Htoo Aung; Khant Zaw Aung; Min Thu Hein; Myint Ko Ko; Naing Lin Oo; Saw Moe Aung; Shine Wai Lin; Than Htay Aung; Thant Zin Oo; Thet Naing Phyo; Yu Ya Maung; Zin Ko Htet	Cambodia; Cheat Nisith; Choub Seiha; Chov Somrach; Horl Lyda; Koem Som; Leng Sothea; Ly Torhieth; Meas Sam Oun; Meas Sinat; Rith Disco; Ron Pherou; Sin Visal; Sothea Lyhieng; Vantha Sakonin
Women's 3 crews (U24) 250 m	Vietnam; Bùi Thị Yến; Diệp Thị Hương; Hồ Thị Ne; Ma Thị Thương; Nguyễn Hồng Thái; Nguyễn Thị Hương	Cambodia; Min Somros; Nak Sreymov; Say Sreynit; Sokha Leakena; Sokha Ratha; Soy Sotheara	Malaysia; Farah Zulaikha Tokiman; Nur Amirah Anisah Kadir; Nur Atasha Nabila Saring; Nur Syahirah Fuad; Nurul Najieha Zulkifli; Siti Nurul Masyitah Elias
Mixed 12 crews (U24) 250 m	Thailand; Teerasak Chuden; Jirawan Hankhamla; Watcharaporn Khaditya; Photsawat Nachaikhong; Sayawadee Ngaosri; Anuthida Saeheng; Thitima Sukrat; Anchalee Thammasing	Myanmar; Myat Min Tun; Myo Hlaing Win; Myo Swe; Phyo Wai Lwin; Phyu Phyu Aung; Pyae Phyo Thant; Saw Kaung Kaung San; Soe Sandar; Soe Soe Kyaw; Su Su Lwin; Thidar Oo; Zaw Zaw Tun	Indonesia; Ana Rahayu; Anisa Yulistiawan; Cinta Priendtisca Nayomi; Dapit; Dede Sunandar; Fitriani Nadea Putri; Indra Hidayat; Muh Burhan; Nadia Hafiza; Ramla Baharuddin; Rudiansyah; Subhi; Wandi; Zubakri
Mixed 12 crews (U24) 500 m	Vietnam; Bùi Thị Yến; Châu Đại Dương; Diệp Thị Hương; Hiên Năm; Hồ Thị Ne; Ma Thị Thương; Nguyễn Hồng Thái; Nguyễn Thị Hương; Nguyễn Văn Cường; Phạm Hồng Quân; Phạm Lương Tú; Trần Thành Cường; Trần Tường Khang; Trương Xuân Nguyên	Myanmar; Aung Phyo Hein; Myat Min Tun; Myo Hlaing Win; Myo Swe; Phyo Wai Lwin; Phyu Phyu Aung; Pyae Phyo Thant; Saw Kaung Kaung San; Soe Sandar; Soe Soe Kyaw; Su Su Lwin; Thet Paing Phyo; Thidar Oo; Zaw Zaw Tun	Cambodia; Horl Dale; La Soknim; Ly Mouslim; Min Somros; Mon Sereyvuht; Nak Sreymov; Ok Mathel; Say Sreynit; Sokha Leakena; Sokha Ratha; Sothea Lyhieng; Soy Sotheara; Vorn Phanet; Vutha Ratana
Mixed 12 crews (U24) 800 m	Vietnam; Bùi Thị Yến; Châu Đại Dương; Diệp Thị Hương; Hiên Năm; Hồ Thị Ne; Hoàng Văn Vương; Ma Thị Thương; Nguyễn Hồng Thái; Nguyễn Thị Hương; Nguyễn Văn Cường; Nguyễn Văn Viết; Phạm Hồng Quân; Trần Thành Cường; Trương Xuân Nguyên	Thailand; Preecha Chanpa; Teerasak Chuden; Jirawan Hankhamla; Watcharaporn Khaditya; Natthapon Kreepkamrai; Photsawat Nachaikhong; Sayawadee Ngaosri; Saharat Pholpikun; Sukrit Rakkarn; Anuthida Saeheng; Phatthara Sangdet; Thitima Sukrat; Anchalee Thammasing; Theerapong Wonginta	Indonesia; Ana Rahayu; Anisa Yulistiawan; Cinta Priendtisca Nayomi; Dapit; Dede Sunandar; Fitriani Nadea Putri; Indra Hidayat; Muh Burhan; Nadia Hafiza; Ramla Baharuddin; Rudiansyah; Subhi; Wandi; Zubakri
