= Dancesport at the 2023 SEA Games =

Breaking at the 2023 SEA Games
- Venue: Chroy Changvar Convention Centre
- Location: Phnom Penh, Cambodia
- Dates: 16 May 2023

Breaking competitions at the 2023 SEA Games took place at Chroy Changvar Convention Centre in Phnom Penh on 16 May 2023. Medals were awarded in 2 events.

== Participating nations ==
- Cambodia (host)
- Indonesia
- Malaysia
- Philippines
- Thailand
- Vietnam

== Medal table ==
* Host nation (Cambodia)

Rank	Nation	Gold	Silver	Bronze	Total
1	Vietnam	1	1	0	2
2	Malaysia	1	0	0	1
3	Thailand	0	1	1	2
4	Indonesia	0	0	1	1
Totals (4 entries)		2	2	2	6

== Medalists ==
=== Breaking ===
Event	Gold	Silver	Bronze
Men's	Sam Jee Lek; Malaysia	Chinavut Chantarat; Thailand	Kantapon Rodsaart; Thailand
Women's	Nguyễn Thị Hồng Trâm; Vietnam	Trần Huỳnh Như; Vietnam	Dwi Cindy Desyana; Indonesia
