= Indonesia at the 2023 SEA Games =

- IOC code: INA
- NOC: Indonesian Olympic Committee
- Website: nocindonesia.id (in English)

in Phnom Penh, Cambodia 5–17 May 2023
- Competitors: 599 in 31 sports
- Flag bearer: Flairene Candrea Wonomiharjo (swimming)
- Medals Ranked 3rd: Gold 87 Silver 80 Bronze 109 Total 276

SEA Games appearances (overview)
- 1977; 1979; 1981; 1983; 1985; 1987; 1989; 1991; 1993; 1995; 1997; 1999; 2001; 2003; 2005; 2007; 2009; 2011; 2013; 2015; 2017; 2019; 2021; 2023; 2025; 2027; 2029

Indonesia participated at the 2023 SEA Games in Phnom Penh, Cambodia from 5 to 16 May 2023. The Indonesian contingent consisted of 599 athletes, 379 being men and 220 women.

== Medal summary ==
=== Medal by sport ===
Medals by sport
| Sport | 1st place, gold medalist(s) | 2nd place, silver medalist(s) | 3rd place, bronze medalist(s) | Total | Rank |
|---|---|---|---|---|---|
| Pencak silat | 9 | 6 | 1 | 16 | 1 |
| Athletics | 7 | 3 | 9 | 19 | 3 |
| Finswimming | 6 | 10 | 5 | 21 | 2 |
| Wushu | 6 | 6 | 2 | 14 | 1 |
| Wrestling | 6 | 6 | 2 | 14 | 2 |
| Badminton | 5 | 3 | 3 | 11 | 1 |
| Weightlifting | 5 | 2 | 4 | 11 | 1 |
| Cycling | 5 | 2 | 1 | 8 | 1 |
| Tennis | 4 | 2 | 3 | 9 | 1 |
| Kun bokator | 3 | 5 | 12 | 20 | 3 |
| Kickboxing | 3 | 4 | 4 | 11 | 4 |
| Esports | 3 | 2 | 0 | 5 | 1 |
| Vovinam | 3 | 1 | 14 | 18 | 5 |
| Traditional boat race | 3 | 1 | 4 | 8 | 2 |
| Swimming | 3 | 1 | 3 | 7 | 4 |
| Karate | 2 | 4 | 7 | 13 | 4 |
| Soft tennis | 2 | 2 | 1 | 5 | 3 |
| Sepak takraw | 2 | 1 | 2 | 5 | 4 |
| Volleyball | 2 | 1 | 1 | 4 | 1 |
| Taekwondo | 1 | 4 | 4 | 9 | 6 |
| Cricket | 1 | 2 | 1 | 4 | 3 |
| Aquathlon | 1 | 1 | 1 | 3 | 3 |
| Judo | 1 | 0 | 5 | 6 | 5 |
| Jet ski | 1 | 0 | 2 | 3 | 3 |
| Basketball | 1 | 0 | 1 | 2 | 3 |
| Indoor hockey | 1 | 0 | 1 | 2 | 1 |
| Football | 1 | 0 | 0 | 1 | 2 |
| Boxing | 0 | 5 | 3 | 8 | 5 |
| Obstacle race | 0 | 1 | 2 | 3 | 3 |
| Golf | 0 | 1 | 1 | 2 | 4 |
| Gymnastics | 0 | 1 | 1 | 2 | 5 |
| Diving | 0 | 1 | 1 | 2 | 2 |
| Water polo | 0 | 1 | 1 | 2 | 3 |
| Triathlon | 0 | 1 | 0 | 1 | 3 |
| Duathlon | 0 | 0 | 2 | 2 | 4 |
| Field hockey | 0 | 0 | 2 | 2 | 4 |
| Billiards | 0 | 0 | 1 | 1 | 9 |
| Dancesport | 0 | 0 | 1 | 1 | 4 |
| Fencing | 0 | 0 | 1 | 1 | 7 |
| Total | 87 | 80 | 109 | 276 | 3 |

=== Medal by gender ===
Medals by gender
| Gender | 1st place, gold medalist(s) | 2nd place, silver medalist(s) | 3rd place, bronze medalist(s) | Total | Percentage |
|---|---|---|---|---|---|
| Male | 53 | 43 | 54 | 150 | 54.3% |
| Female | 30 | 34 | 48 | 112 | 40.6% |
| Mixed | 4 | 3 | 7 | 14 | 5.1% |
| Total | 87 | 80 | 109 | 276 | 100% |

=== Medal by date ===
Medals by date
| Day | Date | 1st place, gold medalist(s) | 2nd place, silver medalist(s) | 3rd place, bronze medalist(s) | Total |
|---|---|---|---|---|---|
| -1 | 4 May | 0 | 1 | 5 | 6 |
| 0 | 5 May | Opening ceremony | | | |
| 1 | 6 May | 8 | 6 | 6 | 20 |
| 2 | 7 May | 8 | 4 | 13 | 25 |
| 3 | 8 May | 6 | 8 | 19 | 33 |
| 4 | 9 May | 3 | 3 | 9 | 15 |
| 5 | 10 May | 11 | 8 | 4 | 23 |
| 6 | 11 May | 8 | 3 | 2 | 13 |
| 7 | 12 May | 7 | 9 | 3 | 19 |
| 8 | 13 May | 7 | 10 | 11 | 28 |
| 9 | 14 May | 12 | 8 | 9 | 29 |
| 10 | 15 May | 6 | 6 | 12 | 24 |
| 11 | 16 May | 11 | 14 | 16 | 41 |
| 12 | 17 May | Closing ceremony | | | |
| Total | | 87 | 80 | 109 | 276 |

=== Medalists ===
| Medal | Name | Sport | Event | Date |
|---|---|---|---|---|
| Gold | Rashif Amila Yaqin | Aquathlon | Men's individual | 6 May |
| Gold | Agus Prayogo | Athletics | Men's marathon | 6 May |
| Gold | Odekta Elvina Naibaho | Athletics | Women's marathon | 6 May |
| Gold | Sayu Bella Sukma Dewi | Cycling | Mountain biking - Women's cross country | 6 May |
| Gold | Feri Yudoyono | Cycling | Mountain biking - Men's cross country | 6 May |
| Gold | Ahmad Zigi Zaresta Yuda | Karate | Men's individual kata | 6 May |
| Gold | Manik Trisna Dewi Wetan | Vovinam | Women's dragon-tiger form | 6 May |
| Gold | Hendro Yap | Athletics | Men's 20 km race walk | 6 May |
| Gold | Manik Trisna Dewi Wetan | Vovinam | Women's ying-yang sword form | 7 May |
| Gold | Dara Latifah; Feri Yudoyono; Sayu Bella Sukma Dewi; Zaenal Fanani | Cycling | Mountain biking - Mixed cross country relay | 7 May |
| Gold | Sandi Firmansyah | Karate | Men's kumite -84kg | 7 May |
| Gold | Puspa Arumsari | Pencak silat | Women's artistic tunggal | 7 May |
| Gold | Asep Yuldan Sani; Anggi Faisal; Rano Slamet Nugraha | Pencak silat | Men's artistic regu | 7 May |
| Gold | Kusuma Ilham; Prawesti Candra; Rahman Ferdian; Firdaus Muhammad; Nugraha Fajar; Santoso Prima; Fajar Alam; Priliandro Revo; Alfiana Muhamad; Guntara Andrea; Leksono Adi; Rahmad Astri | Indoor hockey | Men's team | 7 May |
| Gold | I Gede Siman Sudartawa | Swimming | Men's 50 m backstroke | 7 May |
| Gold | Masniari Wolf | Swimming | Women's 50 m backstroke | 7 May |
| Gold | Tedi Hidayat; Sendiagi Putra; Moch Martin Ramadhan | Kun bokator | Men's bare hands form group | 8 May |
| Gold | Riana Oktavia; Riva Hijriah; Eni Tri Susilowati | Kun bokator | Women's bare hands group | 8 May |
| Gold | Gema Nur Arifin; Yazid Hanifam Kurniawan | Kun bokator | Men's duo group performance | 8 May |
| Gold | Dara Latifah | Cycling | Women's mountain bike eliminator | 8 May |
| Gold | Abdul Hafiz | Athletics | Men's javelin throw | 8 May |
| Gold | Henry Ade Novian; Boy Arnez Arabi; Hendra Kurniawan; Muhammad Malizi; Yuda Mardiansyah Putra; Fahry Septian Putratama; Rivan Nurmulki; Hernanda Zulfi; Farhan Halim; Dio Zulfikri; Agil Angga Anggara; Fahreza Rakha Abhinaya; Doni Haryono; Nizar Julfikar Munawar | Volleyball | Men's indoor | 8 May |
| Gold | Ni Made Purnami; Putu Wahana Maha Yoni | Vovinam | Women's pair knife form | 9 May |
| Gold | Aldila Sutjiadi; Priska Madelyn Nugroho; Jessy Rompies; Beatrice Gumulya | Tennis | Women's team | 9 May |
| Gold | Fernando Sanger; Mario Harley Alibasa; M. Hemat Bhakti Anugerah; Sunu Wahyu Trijati; Tio Juliandi Hutauruk | Soft tennis | Men's team | 9 May |
| Gold | Iqbal Candra Pratama | Pencak silat | Men's tanding class F (70-75kg) | 10 May |
| Gold | Jeni Elvis Kause | Pencak silat | Women's tanding class C (55-60kg) | 10 May |
| Gold | Khoirudin Mustakim | Pencak silat | Men's tanding class A (45-50kg) | 10 May |
| Gold | Atifa Fismawati | Pencak silat | Women's class D (60-65kg) | 10 May |
| Gold | Dwi Rahayu Pitri | Soft tennis | Women's singles | 10 May |
| Gold | Muhammad Zaki Zikrillah Prasong | Pencak silat | Men's tanding class B (50-55kg) | 10 May |
| Gold | Tito Hendra Septa Kurnia | Pencak silat | Men's tanding class E (65-70kg) | 10 May |
| Gold | Safira Dwi Meilani | Pencak silat | Women's tanding class B (50-55kg) | 10 May |
| Gold | Andriani; Yulia Anggraeni; Mia Arda Leta; Ni Kadek Ariani; Maria Corazon Konjep Wombaki; Ni Luh Ketut Wesika Ratna Dewi; Sang Ayu Nyoman Maypriani; Rahmawati Dwi Pangestuti; Berlian Duma Pare; Lie Qiao; Ni Wayan Sariani; Ni Kadek Fitria Rada Rani; Ni Putu Ayu Nanda Sakarini; Laili Salsabila; Ni Made Putri Suwandewi | Cricket | Women's 6s | 10 May |
| Gold | Maria Natalia Londa | Athletics | Women's long jump | 10 May |
| Gold | Lalu Muhammad Zohri; Bayu Kertanegara; Wahyu Setiawan; Sudirman Hadi; Adith Rico Pradana | Athletics | Men's 4×100 m relay | 10 May |
| Gold | Terry Yudha Kusuma | Cycling | Men's road criterium | 11 May |
| Gold | Muhammad Daffa Golden Boy | Wushu | Men's Jiangshu+Qiangshu | 11 May |
| Gold | Delbert Tanoto; Sheldon Andersen Chandra; Kevin Gunawan; Oliver Budi Wangge; Nanda Rizana; Bryan Carlos Setiawan; Willy Ivandra | Esports | Valorant - mixed team | 11 May |
| Gold | Chico Aura Dwi Wardoyo; Christian Adinata; Alwi Farhan; Pramudya Kusumawardana; Yeremia Rambitan; Bagas Maulana; Muhammad Shohibul Fikri; Rehan Naufal Kusharjanto; Zachariah Josiahno Sumanti | Badminton | Men's team | 11 May |
| Gold | Rikki Marthin Luther Simbolon | Athletics | Men's 10000 m | 11 May |
| Gold | Felix Viktor Iberle | Swimming | Men's 50 m breaststroke | 11 May |
| Gold | Rosa Beatrice Malau | Wushu | Women's sanda 45 kg | 11 May |
| Gold | Vivy Indrawaty; Cindy Laurent Siswanto; Isnaini Nurfajri Machdita; Michelle Denise Siswanto; Venny Lim; Violetta Aurelia; Viorelle Valencia Chen | Esports | Mobile Legends: Bang Bang - women's team | 11 May |
| Gold | Edgar Xavier Marvelo | Wushu | Men's Changquan | 12 May |
| Gold | Tharisa Dea Florentina | Wushu | Women's sanda 52kg | 12 May |
| Gold | Laksmana Pandu Pratama | Wushu | Men's sanda 52kg | 12 May |
| Gold | Bintang Reindra Naga Guitara | Wushu | Men's Sanda 56kg | 12 May |
| Gold | Janis Rosalita Suprianto | Finswimming | Women's 100 m surface | 12 May |
| Gold | Harvey Hubert Hutasuhut | Finswimming | Men's 100 m bifins | 12 May |
| Gold | Ressa Kania Dewi; Kaisar Hansel Putra; Harvey Hubert Hutasuhut; Josephine Christable | Finswimming | Mixed 4×100m surface relay | 12 May |
| Gold | Abdul Hamid; Dapit; Dede Sunandar; Indra Hidayat; Irwan; Lukman Nulhakim; Muh Burhan; Rapik Saputra; Rudiansyah; Subhi; Wandi; Zubakri | Traditional boat race | Men's 12 crews (U24) 250 m | 13 May |
| Gold | Priska Madelyn Nugroho | Tennis | Women's singles | 13 May |
| Gold | Eko Yuli Irawan | Weightlifting | Men's 61kg | 13 May |
| Gold | Abdul Muin; Andi Try Sandi Saputra; Anwar Budiyanto; Diky Apriyadi; Jelki Ladada; Muh. Hardiansyah Muliang; Muhammad Hafidz; Rusdi; Syaiful Rijal | Sepak takraw | Men's team doubles | 13 May |
| Gold | Wahyu Anggoro Tamtomo | Finswimming | Men's 50 m surface | 13 May |
| Gold | Janis Rosalita Suprianto | Finswimming | Women's 50 m surface | 13 May |
| Gold | Christopher Rungkat; Aldila Sutjiadi | Tennis | Mixed doubles | 13 May |
| Gold | Adelaide Callista Wongsohardjo; Agustin Elya Gradita Retong; Clarita Antonio; Dewa Ayu Made Sriartha Kusuma; Dyah Lestari; Henny Sutjiono; Kadek Pratita Citta Dewi; Kimberley Pierre-Louis; Nathania Claresta Orville; Peyton Whitted; Priscilla Annabel Karen; Yuni Anggraeni | Basketball | Women's 5x5 basketball | 14 May |
| Gold | Juliana Klarisa | Weightlifting | Women's 55 kg | 14 May |
| Gold | Abdur Rahim; Andri Agus Mulyana; Anwar Tarra; Harjuna; Indra Hidayat; Indra Tri Setiawan; Joko Andriyanto; Maizir Riyondra; Mugi Harjito; Muhammad Yunus Rustandi; Rudiansyah; Sutrisno; Tri Wahyu Buwono; Yuda Firmansyah | Traditional boat race | Men's 12 crews (open) 500 m | 14 May |
| Gold | Dewa Kadek Rama Warma Putra | Judo | Men's 66 kg | 14 May |
| Gold | Suparmanto | Wrestling | Men's greco roman 63 kg | 14 May |
| Gold | Muhammad Aliansyah | Wrestling | Men's greco roman 67 kg | 14 May |
| Gold | Andika Sulaeman | Wrestling | Men's greco roman 77 kg | 14 May |
| Gold | Lulut Gilang Saputra | Wrestling | Men's greco roman 87 kg | 14 May |
| Gold | Rizki Juniansyah | Weightlifting | Men's 73 kg | 14 May |
| Gold | Muhammad Rifqi Fitriadi | Tennis | Men's singles | 14 May |
| Gold | Janis Rosalita Suprianto | Finswimming | Women's 200 m surface | 14 May |
| Gold | Tengku M. Septiadi Ardiansyah; Fazriel Haikal Aditya; Muhammad Afriza; Teuku Muhammad Kausar; Alan Raynold Kumaseh | Esports | PUBG Mobile team | 14 May |
| Gold | Muhammad Hardiansyah Muliang; Rusdi; Syaiful Rijal | Sepak takraw | Men's doubles | 15 May |
| Gold | Tsabitha Alfiah Ramadani | Weightlifting | Women's 64 kg | 15 May |
| Gold | Rahmat Erwin Abdullah | Weightlifting | Men's 81 kg | 15 May |
| Gold | Mutiara Ayuningtyas | Wrestling | Women's 53 kg | 15 May |
| Gold | Abdul Aziz | Kickboxing | Men's kick light 63 kg | 15 May |
| Gold | Megawati Tamesti Maheswari | Taekwondo | Women's kyorugi -53kg | 15 May |
| Gold | Abdur Rahim; Andri Agus Mulyana; Anwar Tarra; Harjuna; Indra Tri Setiawan; Joko Andriyanto; Maizir Riyondra; Mugi Harjito; Muhammad Yunus Rustandi; Sutrisno; Tri Wahyu Buwono; Yuda Firmansyah | Traditional boat race | Men's 12 crews (open) 800 m | 16 May |
| Gold | Rehan Naufal Kusharjanto; Lisa Ayu Kusumawati | Badminton | Mixed doubles | 16 May |
| Gold | Febriana Dwipuji Kusuma; Amalia Cahaya Pratiwi | Badminton | Women's doubles | 16 May |
| Gold | Christian Adinata | Badminton | Men's singles | 16 May |
| Gold | Pramudya Kusumawardana; Yeremia Rambitan | Badminton | Men's doubles | 16 May |
| Gold | Diandra Ariesta Pieter | Kickboxing | Women's kick light 55 kg | 16 May |
| Gold | Toni Kristian Hutapea | Kickboxing | Men's full contact 54 kg | 16 May |
| Gold | Gilang Ramadhan; Danangsyah Pribadi; Mohammad Ashfiya; Bintang Akbar | Beach volleyball | Men's team | 16 May |
| Gold | Aero Sutan Aswar | Jet ski | Endurance runabout open | 16 May |
| Gold | Randa Riandesta | Wrestling | Men's freestyle 79 kg | 16 May |
| Gold | Adi Satryo; Bagas Kaffa; Rio Fahmi; Komang Teguh; Rizky Ridho; Ananda Raehan; Marselino Ferdinan; Witan Sulaeman; Ramadhan Sananta; Beckham Putra; Jeam Kelly Sroyer; Pratama Arhan; Haykal Alhafiz; Fajar Fathur Rahman; Taufany Muslihuddin; Muhammad Ferarri; Irfan Jauhari; Titan Agung; Alfeandra Dewangga; Ernando Ari | Football | Men's team | 16 May |
| Silver | Alfadhila Ramadhan | Kun bokator | Men's single bokator spirit form | 4 May |
| Silver | Zaenal Fanani | Cycling | Mountain biking - Men's cross country | 6 May |
| Silver | Anugerah Nurul Lucky; Dian Monika Nababan; Emilia Sri Hanandyta | Karate | Women's team kata | 6 May |
| Silver | Albiadi; Andi Tomy Aditya Mardana; Andi Dasril Dwi Dharmawan | Karate | Men's team kata | 6 May |
| Silver | Reckyardo Aloysius Mardian; Renata Berliana Aditya; Aryandra Fauzi Mauludin; Dea Salsabila Putri | Aquathlon | Mixed team relay | 6 May |
| Silver | Violine Intan Puspita | Athletics | Women's 20 km race walk | 6 May |
| Silver | Farrel Armandio Tangkas | Swimming | Men's 100 m backstroke | 6 May |
| Silver | Anggun Yolanda Samsul Hadi; Ayu Puspita Sari; Mudji Mulyani; Rahmayuna Fadillah | Obstacle race | Women's team relay | 7 May |
| Silver | Ari Saputra | Karate | Men's kumite –60 kg | 7 May |
| Silver | Cok Istri Agung Sanistyarani | Karate | Women's kumite –55 kg | 7 May |
| Silver | Ririn Rinasih; Riska Hermawan | Pencak silat | Women's artistic ganda | 7 May |
| Silver | Yazid Hanifam Kurniawan | Kun bokator | Men's single phkak form | 8 May |
| Silver | Rashif Amila Yaqin | Triathlon | Men's individual triathlon | 8 May |
| Silver | Gladies Lariesa Garina Haga | Diving | Women's individual 3m springboard | 8 May |
| Silver | Putu Wahana Maha Yoni | Vovinam | Women's self defence | 8 May |
| Silver | Maria Natalia Londa | Athletics | Women's triple jump | 8 May |
| Silver | Yudi Cahyadi | Kun bokator | Men's combat 65 kg | 8 May |
| Silver | Kamal Maulansyah | Kun bokator | Men's combat 60 kg | 8 May |
| Silver | Ade Permana | Kun bokator | Men's combat 50 kg | 8 May |
| Silver | Abiyurafi | Gymnastics | Men's artistic horizontal bar | 9 May |
| Silver | Jason Adrian; Kautsar Faruqurrohman Ekatama; Muhammad Adrian Setiawan; Riddho Putra Muharam; Samuel Santosa; Ivan Supardi | Esports | Crossfire (PC) - mixed team | 9 May |
| Silver | Allif Nafiiah; Dwi Rahayu Pitri; Sharon Cornelia Watupongoh; Siti Nur Arasy; Voni Darlina | Soft tennis | Women's team | 9 May |
| Silver | Suci Wulandari | Pencak silat | Women's tanding U45kg | 10 May |
| Silver | Muhamad Yachser Arafa | Pencak silat | Men's tanding class C (60-65kg) | 10 May |
| Silver | Nia Larasati | Pencak silat | Women's tanding class E (65-70kg) | 10 May |
| Silver | Kadek Andrey Nova Prayada | Pencak silat | Men's tanding class D (60-65kg) | 10 May |
| Silver | M. Hemat Bakti Anugerah | Soft tennis | Men's singles | 10 May |
| Silver | Bayu Lesmana | Pencak silat | Men's tanding class U45kg | 10 May |
| Silver | Tasya Ayu Puspa Dewi | Wushu | Women's nanquan | 10 May |
| Silver | Harris Horatius | Wushu | Men's nanquan | 10 May |
| Silver | Edgar Xavier Marvelo | Wushu | Men's daoshu+Gunshu | 11 May |
| Silver | Komang Ayu Cahya Dewi; Ester Nurumi Tri Wardoyo; Mutiara Ayu Puspitasari; Stephanie Widjaja; Febriana Dwipuji Kusuma; Amalia Cahaya Pratiwi; Meilysa Trias Puspita Sari; Rachel Allessya Rose; Lisa Ayu Kusumawati; Hediana Julimarbela | Badminton | Women's team | 11 May |
| Silver | Eki Febri Ekawati | Athletics | Women's shot put | 11 May |
| Silver | Eugenia Diva Widodo | Wushu | Women's Changquan | 12 May |
| Silver | Harris Horatius | Wushu | Men's nandao+Nangun | 12 May |
| Silver | Aiman Cahyadi | Cycling | Men's road individual mass start | 12 May |
| Silver | Wawan Saputra | Taekwondo | Men's freestyle individual | 12 May |
| Silver | Samuel Marbun | Wushu | Men's sanda 65kg | 12 May |
| Silver | Ressa Kania Dewi | Finswimming | Women's 100m bifins | 12 May |
| Silver | Raqiel Azzahra | Finswimming | Women's 400m bifins | 12 May |
| Silver | Janis Rosalita Suprianto; Katherina Eda Rahayu; Andhini Muthia Maulida; Vania Elvira Elent Rahmadani | Finswimming | Women's 4×200 m surface relay | 12 May |
| Silver | Petrol Apostle Kambey; Bima Dea Sakti Antono; M Amirullah Alfarizi; Dio Novandra | Finswimming | Men's 4×200 m surface relay | 12 May |
| Silver | Elaine Widjaja; Holly Victoria Halim; Kristina Natalia Yoko | Golf | Women's team | 13 May |
| Silver | Andriani; Yulia Anggraeni; Mia Arda Leta; Ni Kadek Ariani; Maria Corazon Konjep Wombaki; Ni Luh Ketut Wesika Ratna Dewi; Sang Ayu Nyoman Maypriani; Rahmawati Dwi Pangestuti; Berlian Duma Pare; Lie Qiao; Ni Wayan Sariani; Ni Kadek Fitria Rada Rani; Ni Putu Ayu Nanda Sakarini; Laili Salsabila; Ni Made Putri Suwandewi | Cricket | Women's 50 overs | 13 May |
| Silver | Asri Udin | Boxing | Men's 57 kg | 13 May |
| Silver | Maikhel Roberrd Muskita | Boxing | Men's 86 kg | 13 May |
| Silver | Petrol Apostle Kambey; Bima Dea Sakti Antono; M Amirullah Alfarizi; Dio Novandra | Finswimming | Men's 4×100 m surface relay | 13 May |
| Silver | Janis Rosalita Suprianto; Katherina Eda Rahayu; Andhini Muthia Maulida; Vania Elvira Elent Rahmadani | Finswimming | Women's 4×100 m surface relay | 13 May |
| Silver | Oza Peby Mulyani | Finswimming | Women's 400 m surface | 13 May |
| Silver | Christopher Rungkat; Nathan Anthony Barki | Tennis | Men's doubles | 13 May |
| Silver | Nicholas Armanto | Taekwondo | Men's kyorugi -87 kg | 13 May |
| Silver | Ni Kadek Heni Prikasih | Taekwondo | Women's kyorugi -46 kg | 13 May |
| Silver | Aldila Sutjiadi; Jessy Rompies | Tennis | Women's doubles | 14 May |
| Silver | Abdul Hamid; Dapit; Dede Sunandar; Indra Hidayat; Irwan; Lukman Nulhakim; Muh Burhan; Rapik Saputra; Rudiansyah; Subhi; Wandi; Zubakri | Traditional boat race | Men's 12 crews (U24) 500 m | 14 May |
| Silver | Aldoms Sugoro | Boxing | Men's 54 kg | 14 May |
| Silver | Dio Koebanu | Boxing | Men's 48 kg | 14 May |
| Silver | Ratna Sari Devi | Boxing | Women's 57 kg | 14 May |
| Silver | Harvey Hubert Hutasuhut | Finswimming | Men's 50 m bifins | 14 May |
| Silver | Oza Peby Mulyani | Finswimming | Women's 800 m surface | 14 May |
| Silver | Janis Rosalita Suprianto; Petrol Apostle Kambey; Vania Elvira Elent Rahmadani; Wahyu Anggoro Tamtomo | Finswimming | Mixed 4×50 m surface relay | 14 May |
| Silver | Andriani; Yulia Anggraeni; Mia Arda Leta; Ni Kadek Ariani; Maria Corazon Konjep Wombaki; Ni Luh Ketut Wesika Ratna Dewi; Sang Ayu Nyoman Maypriani; Rahmawati Dwi Pangestuti; Berlian Duma Pare; Lie Qiao; Ni Wayan Sariani; Ni Kadek Fitria Rada Rani; Ni Putu Ayu Nanda Sakarini; Laili Salsabila; Ni Made Putri Suwandewi | Cricket | Women's T20 | 15 May |
| Silver | Kharisma Tantri Herlina | Wrestling | Women's 62 kg | 15 May |
| Silver | Candra Marimar | Wrestling | Women's 55 kg | 15 May |
| Silver | Varadisa Septi Putri Hidayat | Wrestling | Women's 76 kg | 15 May |
| Silver | Osanando Naufal Khairudin | Taekwondo | Men's kyorugi -80kg | 15 May |
| Silver | Alan Raynold Kumaseh | Esports | PUBG Mobile individual | 15 May |
| Silver | Muhammad Zul Ilmi | Weightlifting | Men's 89 kg | 16 May |
| Silver | Nurul Akmal | Weightlifting | Women's +71 kg | 16 May |
| Silver | Meilysa Trias Puspita Sari; Rachel Allessya Rose | Badminton | Women's doubles | 16 May |
| Silver | Chico Aura Dwi Wardoyo | Badminton | Men's singles | 16 May |
| Silver | Andi Try Sandi Saputra; Diky Apriyadi; Jelki Ladada; Muh. Hardiansyah Muliang; Muhammad Hafidz; Rusdi; Syaiful Rijal | Sepak takraw | Men's quadrant | 16 May |
| Silver | Yokebed Purari Eka; Nur Atika Sari; Desi Ratnasari; Dhita Juliana | Beach volleyball | Women's team | 16 May |
| Silver | Ahmad Fauzy Mappatabe; Beby Willy Eka Paksi Tarigan; Brandley Ignatius Legawa; Fakhry Mahmud; Gilang Nabhil Saputra; Hizkia Bimantoro; Novian Dwiputra; Rezza Auditya Putra; Rian Rinaldo; Richley Gregorius Legawa; Ridjkie Mulia; Yusuf Budiman; Zaenal Arifin | Water polo | Men's team | 16 May |
| Silver | Rachmat Hadi wijaya | Wrestling | Men's freestyle 74 kg | 16 May |
| Silver | Zainal Abidin | Wrestling | Men's freestyle 61 kg | 16 May |
| Silver | Hamka | Wrestling | Men's freestyle 65 kg | 16 May |
| Silver | Salmri Stendra Pattisamallo | Kickboxing | Men's K-1 51 kg | 16 May |
| Silver | Firman Muharram Syach | Kickboxing | Men's full contact 67 kg | 16 May |
| Silver | Firman Muharram Syach | Kickboxing | Men's kick light 69 kg | 16 May |
| Silver | Susanti Ndapataka | Kickboxing | Women's low kick 56 kg | 16 May |
| Bronze | Gema Nur Arifin | Kun bokator | Men's single bamboo shield form | 4 May |
| Bronze | Deslya Anggraini | Kun bokator | Women's single bamboo shield form | 4 May |
| Bronze | Dzaky Fadhlurrohman | Kun bokator | Men's single bare hands form | 4 May |
| Bronze | Riana Oktavia | Kun bokator | Women's single bokator spirit form | 4 May |
| Bronze | Dwi Jayanti | Kun bokator | Women's single bare hands form | 4 May |
| Bronze | Dea Salsabila Putri | Aquathlon | Women's individual | 6 May |
| Bronze | Anggun Yolanda Samsul Hadi | Obstacle race | Women's individual | 6 May |
| Bronze | Ni Wayan Vina Puspita; Kade Ayu Mas Sasvita Dewi | Vovinam | Women's dual form | 6 May |
| Bronze | I Made Khrisna Dwipayana; I Wayan Purbawa; Efrie Surya Perdana; I Kadek Mogi Bahana Lenge; Dewa Gede Tomi Sanjaya | Vovinam | Men's team leg 4x | 6 May |
| Bronze | Krisda Putri Aprilia | Karate | Women's individual kata | 6 May |
| Bronze | Dewa Gde Tomi Sanjaya; I Gusti Agung Gede Ary Wirawan; I Nyoman Suryawan; I Wayan Sumertayasa; Kadek Edey Dwi Payana | Vovinam | Men's team ying-yang sword form 4x | 6 May |
| Bronze | Sedlita Pilon Nubatonis | Duathlon | Men's individual | 7 May |
| Bronze | Angga Cahya; Fahrun; Panji Mohamad Paisal; Putra Waluya Nuryayi | Obstacle race | Men's team relay | 7 May |
| Bronze | Maharani Azhri Wahyuningtyas | Duathlon | Women's individual | 7 May |
| Bronze | I Wayan Wisma Pratama Putra; Efrie Surya Perdana | Vovinam | Men's pair machette form | 7 May |
| Bronze | Adelaide Callista Wongsohardjo; Agustin Elya Gradita Retong; Dyah Lestari; Kimberley Pierre Louis | Basketball | Women's 3x3 basketball | 7 May |
| Bronze | I Kadek Mogi Bahana Lenge; I Made Khrisna Dwipayana; I Wayan Purbawa; Kade Ayu Mas Sasvita Dewi; Ni Wayan Vina Puspita; Putu Wahana Maha Yoni | Vovinam | Mixed team basic shelf-defence technique | 7 May |
| Bronze | Ignatius Joshua Kandou | Karate | Men's kumite –75 kg | 7 May |
| Bronze | Ceyco Georgia Zefanya | Karate | Women's kumite –68 kg | 7 May |
| Bronze | Dessyinta Rakawuni Banurea | Karate | Women's kumite +68 kg | 7 May |
| Bronze | Voni Darlina; Siti Nur Arasy | Soft tennis | Women's double | 7 May |
| Bronze | Tebing Hutapea | Karate | Men's kumite –67 kg | 7 May |
| Bronze | Aulia Rahma Dwi; Zulita; Purbasari Citra; Patmawati; Risdiyanti Winda; Since Novita; Sugiarti Nuraini; Melis Ai; Wardani Desi; El Islamy Annur; Florentina Selly; Krismonita Putri | Indoor hockey | Women's team | 7 May |
| Bronze | Kade Ayu Mas Sasvita Dewi; Ni Made Purnami; Ni Wayan Vina Puspita; Putu Wahana Maha Yoni | Vovinam | Women's team ying yang sword form 4x | 7 May |
| Bronze | Maylen Christy Aupe | Kun bokator | Women's combat 60 kg | 8 May |
| Bronze | Selviah Pertiwi | Kun bokator | Women's combat 55 kg | 8 May |
| Bronze | Diana Ratna Dewi | Kun bokator | Women's combat 50 kg | 8 May |
| Bronze | Miftahul Jannah | Kun bokator | Women's combat 45 kg | 8 May |
| Bronze | Samuel Frekson Wouw | Kun bokator | Men's combat 70 kg | 8 May |
| Bronze | Obaja Halomon Sianturi | Kun bokator | Men's combat 55 kg | 8 May |
| Bronze | Ihza Muhammad | Cycling | Men's mountain bike eliminator | 8 May |
| Bronze | Kadek Dwi Darmadi | Vovinam | Men's four element staff form | 8 May |
| Bronze | I Gusti Agung Ngurah Surdyana | Vovinam | Men's ying yang sword form | 8 May |
| Bronze | Kadek Edey Dwipayana; I Putu Sudharma Putra | Vovinam | Men's pair knife form | 8 May |
| Bronze | Ceyco Georgia Zefanya; Cok Istri Agung Sanistyarani; Dessyinta Rakawuni Banurea; Devina Dea | Karate | Women's team kumite | 8 May |
| Bronze | Ari Saputra; Faisal Halomoan Siahaan; Huggies Yustisio; Ignatius Joshua Kandou; Muhammad Tegar Januar; Sandi Firmansyah; Tebing Hutapea | Karate | Men's team kumite | 8 May |
| Bronze | Ni Made Ayu Ratih Daneswari | Vovinam | Women's aspect broadsword single form | 8 May |
| Bronze | Lalu Muhammad Zohri | Athletics | Men's 200 m | 8 May |
| Bronze | Odekta Elvina Naibaho | Athletics | Women's 5000 m | 8 May |
| Bronze | Agustinus Abadi Ndiken | Athletics | Men's javelin throw | 8 May |
| Bronze | Wahyudi Putra | Athletics | Men's 1500 m | 8 May |
| Bronze | Farrel Armandio Tangkas; Muhammad Dwiky Raharjo; Joe Aditya Wijaya Kurniawan; Erick Ahmad Fathoni | Swimming | Men's 4×100m medley relay | 8 May |
| Bronze | Deslya Anggraini; Moch Martin Ramadhan; Sendiagi Putra | Kun bokator | Mixed 1 female, 2 male group performance | 8 May |
| Bronze | Ni Made Purnami; Manik Trisna Dewi Wetan | Vovinam | Women's pair sword form | 9 May |
| Bronze | Efrie Surya Perdana; I Gusti Agung Ngurah Suardyana; I Wayan Wisma Pratama Putra; Kade Ayu Mas Sasvita Dewi; Kadek Dwi Dharmadi | Vovinam | Mixed multiple training | 9 May |
| Bronze | Manik Trisna Dewi Wetan | Vovinam | Women's dual knife form | 9 May |
| Bronze | Joseph Judah Hatoguan | Gymnastics | Men's artistic floor | 9 May |
| Bronze | Christopher Rungkat; Muhammad Rifqi Fitriadi; Nathan Anthony Barki; David Agung Susanto | Tennis | Men's team | 9 May |
| Bronze | I Nyoman Suryawan | Vovinam | Men's 70 kg | 9 May |
| Bronze | Robi Syianturi | Athletics | Men's 5000 m | 9 May |
| Bronze | Sapwaturrahman | Athletics | Men's long jump | 9 May |
| Bronze | Angel Gabriella Yus | Swimming | Women's 100 m backstroke | 9 May |
| Bronze | Gladies Lariesa Garina Haga | Diving | Women's individual 10m platform | 10 May |
| Bronze | Dina Aulia | Athletics | Women's 100 m hurdles | 10 May |
| Bronze | Pandu Sukarya | Athletics | Men's 3000 m steeplechase | 10 May |
| Bronze | Ronaldo Neno | Pencak silat | Men's tanding class I | 10 May |
| Bronze | Seraf Naro Siregar | Wushu | Men's daoshu+Gunshu | 11 May |
| Bronze | Muhammad Dwiky Raharjo | Swimming | Men's 50 m breaststroke | 11 May |
| Bronze | Bayu Raka Putra | Wushu | Men's sanda 60kg | 12 May |
| Bronze | Odekta Elvina Naibaho | Athletics | Women's 10000 m | 12 May |
| Bronze | Dhendy Krhistanto; Gebby Adi Wibawa Putra | Billiards | Men's snooker doubles | 12 May |
| Bronze | Muhammad Husni | Weightlifting | Men's 55 kg | 13 May |
| Bronze | Amadeus Christian Susanto; Jonathan Xavier Hartono; Rendy Arbenata Mohamad Bintang; Rayhan Abdul Latief | Golf | Men's team | 13 May |
| Bronze | Ana Rahayu; Anisa Yulistiawan; Cinta Priendtisca Nayomi; Dapit; Dede Sunandar; Fitriani Nadea Putri; Indra Hidayat; Muh Burhan; Nadia Hafiza; Ramla Baharuddin; Rudiansyah; Subhi; Wandi; Zubakri | Traditional boat race | Mixed 12 crews (U24) 250 m | 13 May |
| Bronze | Luluk Diana Tri Wijayana | Weightlifting | Women's 49 kg | 13 May |
| Bronze | M. Amirullah Alfarizi | Finswimming | Men's 400 m surface | 13 May |
| Bronze | David Agung Susanto; Beatrice Gumulya | Tennis | Mixed doubles | 13 May |
| Bronze | Farrand Papendang | Boxing | Men's 63.5 kg | 13 May |
| Bronze | Sarohatua Lumbantobing | Boxing | Men's 71 kg | 13 May |
| Bronze | Novita Sinadia | Boxing | Men's 54 kg | 13 May |
| Bronze | Adam Yazid Ferdyansyah | Taekwondo | Men's kyorugi -68 kg | 13 May |
| Bronze | Dinda Putri Lestari | Taekwondo | Women's kyorugi -73 kg | 13 May |
| Bronze | Mohammad Yasin | Weightlifting | Men's 67 kg | 14 May |
| Bronze | Fitriana Sabrina; Beatrice Gumulya | Tennis | Women's doubles | 14 May |
| Bronze | Dapit; Dede Sunandar; Muh Burhan; Rudiansyah; Subhi; Wandi; Zubakri | Traditional boat race | Men's 5 crews (U24) 500 m | 14 May |
| Bronze | Muhammad Alfiansyah | Judo | Men's 60 kg | 14 May |
| Bronze | Andhini Muthia Maulida | Finswimming | Women's 800 m surface | 14 May |
| Bronze | Katherina Eda Rahayu | Finswimming | Women's 200 m surface | 14 May |
| Bronze | Ressa Kania Dewi | Finswimming | Women's 50 m bifins | 14 May |
| Bronze | Kaisar Hansel Putra | Finswimming | Men's 400 m bifins | 14 May |
| Bronze | Yulis Indahyani; Ratri Wulandari; Megawati Hangestri Pertiwi; Arneta Putri Amelian; Nandita Ayu Salsabila; Hany Budiarti; Agustin Wulandhari; Wilda Nurfadhilah; Tisya Amallya Putri; Shintia Alliva Mauludina; Aulia Suci Nurfadilla; Mediol Stiovanny Yoku | Volleyball | Women's indoor | 14 May |
| Bronze | Muhammad Irfandi Nurkamil; Ricky Dishullimah; Dita Afriadi | Fencing | Men's team sabre | 15 May |
| Bronze | Kadek Gamantika; Muhammad Afis; Gede Arta; Ketut Artawan; Ferdinando Banunaek; Kadek Darmawan; Danilson Hawoe; Maxi Koda; Muhaddis; Ketut Pastika; Gede Prastama; Gema Pramanda; Gede Priandana; Ahmad Ramdoni; Anjar Tadarus | Cricket | Men's 6s | 15 May |
| Bronze | Kusnella; Lena; Fujy Anggi Lestari | Sepak takraw | Women's doubles | 15 May |
| Bronze | Restu Anggi | Weightlifting | Women's 71 kg | 15 May |
| Bronze | Annisa Safitria | Wrestling | Women's 50 kg | 15 May |
| Bronze | Qori Amrullah Al Haq Nugraha | Judo | Men's 73kg | 15 May |
| Bronze | Meli Marta Rosita | Judo | Women's 48kg | 15 May |
| Bronze | Shifa Aulia | Judo | Women's 44kg | 15 May |
| Bronze | Silvana Lamanda | Taekwondo | Women's kyorugi -67kg | 15 May |
| Bronze | Muhammad Bassam Raihan | Taekwondo | Men's kyorugi -63kg | 15 May |
| Bronze | Paula Rewade Saruke | Kickboxing | Women's full contact 48 kg | 15 May |
| Bronze | Fani Febriyanti | Kickboxing | Women's light contact 50 kg | 15 May |
| Bronze | Aenah Aeliyah Purbaningrum; Amazia Keiko Radisty; Desthia Ramadhina Putri; Febrika Indirawati; Febrina Indriasari; Glindra Patricia Legawa; Indah Safitri; Jeanette Ayu Puspita; Melyn Cecilia Legawa; Nazwa Nur Abellia; Nyoman Ayu Savitri Arsana; Selfia Nur Fitroch; Thytania Rhamadini Putri | Water polo | Women's team | 16 May |
| Bronze | Komang Ayu Cahya Dewi | Badminton | Women's singles | 16 May |
| Bronze | Ester Nurumi Tri Wardoyo | Badminton | Women's singles | 16 May |
| Bronze | Muhammad Shohibul Fikri; Bagas Maulana | Badminton | Men's doubles | 16 May |
| Bronze | Ardiansyah Darmansyah | Wrestling | Men's freestyle 70 kg | 16 May |
| Bronze | Aqsa Sutan Aswar | Jet ski | Endurance runabout open | 16 May |
| Bronze | Aqsa Sutan Aswar | Jet ski | Runabout stock | 16 May |
| Bronze | Rumaropen Julius; Muhamad Fadli; Alam Asrul; Rahmad Astri; Atwo Frank; Asasi Ahdan; Ardam; Fajar Alam; Priliandro Revo; Prastyo Alfandy; Efendi Jerry; Raditya Derangga; Fathur Mochamad; Wibowo Arthur; Maulana Nurul; Al Akbar Abdullah; Al Ardh Aulia; Guntara Andrea | Field hockey | Men's team | 16 May |
| Bronze | Greschela; Widiyana Saruli; Dwi Aulia Rahma; Adriana Asa; Lispa; Yuanita Suwito; Since Novita; Nur Anisa; Melinda; Nisa Indira; Sismya Winarsih; Annur El Islamy; Adna Fika; Salma Maulani; Selly Florentina; Paulina Ronsumbre; Dian Wildiani; Ruth Bransik | Field hockey | Women's team | 16 May |
| Bronze | Dwi Cindy Desyana | Dancesport | Women's breaking (b-girls 1vs1) | 16 May |
| Bronze | I Dewa Ayu Mira Widari; I Gede Agastya Darma Wardana; I Komang Ardiarta; Maryam March Maharani; Qori Amrullah Al Haq Nugraha; Syerina | Judo | Mixed team | 16 May |
| Bronze | Asmaul Husna; Dita Pratiwi; Fitra Siu; Kusnelia; Lena; Wan Annisa Rachmadi | Sepak takraw | Women's quadrant | 16 May |
| Bronze | Claudions Reco | Kickboxing | Men's K-1 67 kg | 16 May |
| Bronze | David Leonardo | Kickboxing | Men's light contact 63 kg | 16 May |
| Bronze | Ana Rahayu; Anisa Yulistiawan; Cinta Priendtisca Nayomi; Dapit; Dede Sunandar; Fitriani Nadea Putri; Indra Hidayat; Muh Burhan; Nadia Hafiza; Ramla Baharuddin; Rudiansyah; Subhi; Wandi; Zubakri | Traditional boat race | Mixed 12 crews (U24) 800 m | 16 May |
| Bronze | Abdul Hamid; Dede Sunandar; Irwan; Lukman Nulhakim; Muh Burhan; Rapik Saputra; Wandi | Traditional boat race | Men's 5 crews (U24) 800 m | 16 May |

== Competitors ==
The following is the list of number of competitors in the Games.

| Sport | Men | Women | Total |
|---|---|---|---|
| Athletics | 18 | 9 | 27 |
| Badminton | 10 | 10 | 20 |
| Basketball | 12 | 12 | 24 |
| Billiards | 6 | —N/a | 6 |
| Boxing | 8 | 3 | 11 |
| Cricket | 15 | 15 | 30 |
| Cycling | 10 | 6 | 16 |
| Dancesport | 1 | 1 | 2 |
| Diving | 0 | 1 | 1 |
| Esports | 33 | 7 | 40 |
| Fencing | 6 | 1 | 7 |
| Finswimming | 8 | 8 | 16 |
| Football | 20 | —N/a | 20 |
| Hockey | 26 | 12 | 38 |
| Golf | 4 | 3 | 7 |
| Gymnastics | 2 | —N/a | 2 |
| Jet ski | 5 | —N/a | 5 |
| Judo | 7 | 6 | 13 |
| Karate | 11 | 9 | 20 |
| Kickboxing | 12 | 5 | 17 |
| Vovinam | 14 | 5 | 19 |
| Kun bokator | 14 | 7 | 21 |
| Obstacle race | 4 | 4 | 8 |
| Pencak silat | 11 | 9 | 20 |
| Sepak takraw | 9 | 7 | 16 |
| Soft tennis | 5 | 5 | 10 |
| Swimming | 12 | 12 | 24 |
| Table tennis | 2 | 2 | 4 |
| Taekwondo | 6 | 5 | 11 |
| Tennis | 5 | 5 | 10 |
| Traditional boat race | 24 | 6 | 30 |
| Triathlon | 5 | 5 | 10 |
| Volleyball | 18 | 16 | 34 |
| Water polo | 13 | 13 | 26 |
| Weightlifting | 6 | 6 | 12 |
| Wrestling | 9 | 5 | 14 |
| Wushu | 7 | 7 | 14 |
| Total | 379 | 220 | 599 |

Demonstration events

| Sport | Men | Women | Total |
|---|---|---|---|
| Teqball | 3 | 1 | 4 |

== Demonstration Sports medalists ==
The following Indonesia competitors won medals at the demonstration events.

| Medal | Name | Sport | Event | Date |
|---|---|---|---|---|
| Silver | Yunita Indria | Teqball | Women's singles | 8 May |
| Silver | Yoga Ardika Putra | Teqball | Men's singles | 8 May |

== Athletics ==
The Indonesian Athletics Team dispatched 28 athletes consisting of 18 male athletes and 10 female athletes to compete in the 2023 Southeast Asian Games.

=== Men ===
| Athlete | Event | Heats | | Final | |
| Athlete | Event | Result | Rank | Result | Rank |
|---|---|---|---|---|---|
| Wahyu Setiawan | 100 m | 10.66 | 3 | Did not advance | |
| Lalu Muhammad Zohri | 100 m | 10.56 | 4 q | DNS | |
| Lalu Muhammad Zohri | 200 m | 21.130 | 2 Q | 21.020 | 3rd place, bronze medalist(s) |
| Bayu Kertanegara | 200 m | 21.320 | 4 Q | 21.580 | 6 |
| Wahyudi Putra | 800 m | —N/a | | DNS | |
| Wahyudi Putra | 1500 m | —N/a | | 03:59.36 | 3rd place, bronze medalist(s) |
| Robi Syianturi | 5000 m | —N/a | | 14:43.540 | 3rd place, bronze medalist(s) |
| Rikki Marthin Luther Simbolon | 10000 m | —N/a | | 31:08.850 | 1st place, gold medalist(s) |
| Agus Prayogo | 10000 m | —N/a | | 31:53.520 | 4 |
| Halomoan Edwin Binsar | 400 m hurdles | 55.50 | 4 q | 51.54 | 4 |
| Pandu Sukarya | 3000 m steeplechase | —N/a | | 08:55.05 | 3rd place, bronze medalist(s) |
| Atjong Tio Purwanto | 3000 m steeplechase | —N/a | | 08:55.49 | 4 |
| Lalu Muhammad Zohri; Bayu Kertanegara; Wahyu Setiawan; Sudirman Hadi; Adit Rico Irawan | 4x100 m relay | —N/a | | 39.110 | 1st place, gold medalist(s) |
| Agus Prayogo | Marathon | —N/a | | 02:32.59 | 1st place, gold medalist(s) |
| Hendro Yap | 20 km walk | —N/a | | 01:40.42 | 1st place, gold medalist(s) |
| Idan Fauzan Richsan | Pole vault | —N/a | | 4.85 | 4 |
| Suwandi Wijaya | Long jump | —N/a | | 7.4700 | 6 |
| Sapwaturrahman | Long jump | —N/a | | 7.6200 | 3rd place, bronze medalist(s) |
| Sapwaturrahman | Triple jump | —N/a | | 14.750 | 9 |
| Abdul Hafiz | Javelin throw | —N/a | | 69.60 | 1st place, gold medalist(s) |
| Agustinus Abadi Ndiken | Javelin throw | —N/a | | 66.20 | 3rd place, bronze medalist(s) |

=== Women ===
| Athlete | Event | Heats | | Final | |
| Athlete | Event | Result | Rank | Result | Rank |
|---|---|---|---|---|---|
| Mutiara Oktarani Nurul Al Pasha | 800m | —N/a | | 02:14:350 | 5 |
| Mutiara Oktarani Nurul Al Pasha | 1500 m | —N/a | | 04:38.640 | 6 |
| Odekta Elvina Naibaho | 5000m | —N/a | | 17:13.63 | 3rd place, bronze medalist(s) |
| Odekta Elvina Naibaho | 10000m | —N/a | | 35:31.03 | 3rd place, bronze medalist(s) |
| Odekta Elvina Naibaho | Marathon | —N/a | | 02:48.14 | 1st place, gold medalist(s) |
| Emilia Nova | 100 m hurdles | 13.87 | 2 Q | 13.96 | 4 |
| Dina Aulia | 100 m hurdles | 13.51 | 2 Q | 13.59 | 3rd place, bronze medalist(s) |
| Violine Intan Puspita | 20 km walk | —N/a | | 01:55.14 | 2nd place, silver medalist(s) |
| Diva Renata Jayadi | Pole vault | —N/a | | 4.00 | 4 |
| Maria Andriani Melabessy | Pole vault | —N/a | | 3.45 | 6 |
| Maria Natalia Londa | Long jump | —N/a | | 6.28 | 1st place, gold medalist(s) |
| Maria Natalia Londa | Triple jump | —N/a | | 13.50 | 2nd place, silver medalist(s) |
| Eki Febri Ekawati | Shot put | —N/a | | 15.2400 | 2nd place, silver medalist(s) |

== Badminton ==
Badminton Association of Indonesia sent 20 athletes to compete in the 2023 SEA Games consisting of 10 male athletes and 10 female athletes. Shesar Hiren Rhustavito did not participate at the Games due to injury he suffered before leaving to Cambodia.

=== Men ===
| Athlete | Event | Round of 32 | Round of 16 | Quarterfinal | Semifinal | Final | |
| Athlete | Event | Opposition Score | Opposition Score | Opposition Score | Opposition Score | Opposition Score | Rank |
|---|---|---|---|---|---|---|---|
| Chico Aura Dwi Wardoyo | Singles | Bye | M Velasco (PHI); W (21–10, 21–12) | Lê Đ P (VIE); W (21–6, 21–18) | Lee S Y (MAS); W (21–15, 21–18) | C Adinata (INA); L (12–21, 21–18, 18–21) | 2nd place, silver medalist(s) |
| Christian Adinata | Singles | Bye | S Jamsri (THA); W (21–16, 21–18) | Nguyễn H Đ (VIE); W (21–11, 21–14) | Leong J H (MAS); W (21–19, 21–12) | C A Dwi Wardoyo (INA); W (21–12, 18–21, 21–18) | 1st place, gold medalist(s) |
| Muhammad Shohibul Fikri; Bagas Maulana | Doubles | Bye | | C Bernardo / A Morada (PHI); W (21–18, 21–15) | P Sukphun / P Teeraratsakul (THA); L (12–21, 19–21) | Did not advance | 3rd place, bronze medalist(s) |
| Pramudya Kusumawardana; Yeremia Rambitan | Doubles | Bye | | R Oupthong / N Yordphaisong (THA); W (21–14, 11–21, 21–15) | Nge J J / J Prajogo (SGP); W (21–16, 21–18) | P Sukphun / P Teeraratsakul (THA); W (21–17, 21–19) | 1st place, gold medalist(s) |
| Chico Aura Dwi Wardoyo; Christian Adinata; Alwi Farhan; Pramudya Kusumawardana; Yeremia Rambitan; Bagas Maulana; Muhammad Shohibul Fikri; Rehan Naufal Kusharjanto; Zachariah Josiahno Sumanti | Team | —N/a | | Bye | Singapore (SIN); W 3–1 | Malaysia (MAS); W 3–1 | 1st place, gold medalist(s) |

=== Women ===
| Athlete | Event | Round of 16 | Quarterfinal | Semifinal | Final | |
| Athlete | Event | Opposition Score | Opposition Score | Opposition Score | Opposition Score | Rank |
|---|---|---|---|---|---|---|
| Komang Ayu Cahya Dewi | Singles | P Chenda (CAM); W (21–3, 21–5) | M Lee (SGP); W (21–10, 21–9) | L Chaiwan (THA); L (14–21, 18–21) | Did not advance | 3rd place, bronze medalist(s) |
| Ester Nurumi Tri Wardoyo | Singles | Ong X Y (MAS); W (21–15, 21–18) | Nguyễn T L (VIE); W (21–8, 14–21, 21–17) | S Katethong (THA); L (11–21, 10–21) | Did not advance | 3rd place, bronze medalist(s) |
| Febriana Dwipuji Kusuma; Amalia Cahaya Pratiwi | Doubles | Bye | N Albo / T Pomar (PHI); W (21–19, 21–18) | Lee X J / Low Y Y (MAS); W (21–9, 21–9) | M T Puspita Sari / R A Rose (INA); W (21–17, 21–16) | 1st place, gold medalist(s) |
| Meilysa Trias Puspita Sari; Rachel Allessya Rose | Doubles | Bye | L Kanhala / P Muenwong (THA); W (18–21, 21–16, 21–16) | Cheng S H / Cheng S Y (MAS); W (21–10, 21–17) | F D Kusuma / A C Pratiwi (INA); W (17–21, 16–21) | 2nd place, silver medalist(s) |
| Komang Ayu Cahya Dewi; Ester Nurumi Tri Wardoyo; Mutiara Ayu Puspitasari; Stephanie Widjaja; Febriana Dwipuji Kusuma; Amalia Cahaya Pratiwi; Meilysa Trias Puspita Sari; Rachel Allessya Rose; Lisa Ayu Kusumawati; Hediana Julimarbela | Team | —N/a | Cambodia (CAM); W 3–0 | Philippines (PHI); W 3–0 | Thailand (THA); L 0–3 | 2nd place, silver medalist(s) |

=== Mixed ===
| Athlete | Event | Round of 16 | Quarterfinal | Semifinal | Final | |
| Athlete | Event | Opposition Score | Opposition Score | Opposition Score | Opposition Score | Rank |
|---|---|---|---|---|---|---|
| Rehan Naufal Kusharjanto; Lisa Ayu Kusumawati | Mixed | Bye | S Padiz / E Inayo (PHI); W (24–22, 21–10) | R Makkasasithorn / C Korepap (THA); W (19–21, 21–18, 21–19) | Yap R K / Cheng S Y (MAS); W (20–22, 21–8, 21–16) | 1st place, gold medalist(s) |
| Zachariah Josiahno Sumanti; Hediana Julimarbela | Mixed | Teeraratsakul / Muenwong (THA); L (21–11, 22–24, 20–22) | Did not advance | | | |

== Basketball ==
=== 5x5 Basketball ===
==== Men's tournament ====
| Team | Event | Group Stage | | | | Semifinal | Final | |
| Team | Event | Opposition Score | Opposition Score | Opposition Score | Rank | Opposition Score | Opposition Score | Rank |
|---|---|---|---|---|---|---|---|---|
| Indonesia men's | Men's 5x5 | Laos; W 141-37 | Vietnam; W 88-82 | Thailand; W 87-69 | 1 Q | Philippines; L 76-84 | Thailand; L 69-83 | 4 |

==== Women's tournament ====
| Team | Event | Round-robin | | | | | | |
| Team | Event | Opposition Score | Opposition Score | Opposition Score | Opposition Score | Opposition Score | Opposition Score | Rank |
|---|---|---|---|---|---|---|---|---|
| Indonesia women's | Women's 5x5 | Vietnam; W 67-62 | Thailand; W 70-69 | Malaysia; W 85-57 | Philippines; W 89-68 | Cambodia; W 100-54 | Singapore; W 86-39 | 1st place, gold medalist(s) |

=== 3x3 Basketball ===
==== Men's tournament ====
| Team | Event | Group Stage | | | | Semifinal | Final | |
| Team | Event | Opposition Score | Opposition Score | Opposition Score | Rank | Opposition Score | Opposition Score | Rank |
|---|---|---|---|---|---|---|---|---|
| Indonesia men's | Men's 3x3 | Vietnam; L 18-21 | Laos; W 21-11 | Philippines; L 11-21 | 3 | Did not advance | | |

==== Women's tournament ====
| Team | Event | Group Stage | | | | Semifinal | Final / BM | |
| Team | Event | Opposition Score | Opposition Score | Opposition Score | Rank | Opposition Score | Opposition Score | Rank |
|---|---|---|---|---|---|---|---|---|
| Indonesia women's | Women's 3x3 | Singapore; W 21-11 | Malaysia; W 21-12 | Cambodia; L 13-14 | 2 Q | Vietnam; L 17-21 | Cambodia; W 21-15 | 3rd place, bronze medalist(s) |

== Boxing ==
| Athlete | Event | Preliminaries | Quarterfinals | Semifinals | Final | |
| Athlete | Event | Opposition Result | Opposition Result | Opposition Result | Opposition Result | Rank |
|---|---|---|---|---|---|---|
Men
| Dio Koebanu | Men's 48kg | —N/a | M L J Durens (PHI); W 5–0 | K Khamsatone (LAO); W 5–0 | N Thuamcharoen (THA); L 0–5 | 2nd place, silver medalist(s) |
| Ingatan Ilahi | Men's 51kg | —N/a | R Ladon (PHI); L 0–5 | Did not advance | | |
| Aldoms Suguro | Men's 54kg | Bye | M H B Hamid (SIN); W 5–0 | V A Tran (VIE); W 5–0 | C C Paalam (PHI); L 0–5 | 2nd place, silver medalist(s) |
| Asri Udin | Men's 57kg | —N/a | V Liheang (CAM); W 5–0 | S Thammavongsa (LAO); W RSC | I C Bautista (PHI); L 0–5 | 2nd place, silver medalist(s) |
| Fido Rafael Masoara | Men's 60kg | Bye | M R M Johari (MAS); L RSC | Did not advance | | |
| Farrand Papendang | Men's 63.5kg | —N/a | Bye | V Ratha (CAM); L 0–5 | Did not advance | 3rd place, bronze medalist(s) |
| Sarohatua Lumbantobing | Men's 71kg | —N/a | H Kimheang (CAM); W KO | A Phoemsap (THA); L 0–5 | Did not advance | 3rd place, bronze medalist(s) |
| Maikhel Roberrd Muskita | Men's 86kg | —N/a | | A Phoemsap (MAS); W 4–1 | J Yomkhot (THA); L 0–5 | 2nd place, silver medalist(s) |
Women
| Novita Sinadia | Women's 51kg | —N/a | R B Rosli (SGP); W 5–0 | I Magno (PHI); L 0–5 | Did not advance | 3rd place, bronze medalist(s) |
| Huswatun Hasanah | Women's 63kg | —N/a | R L Pasuit (PHI); L 2–3 | Did not advance | | |
| Ratna Sari Devi | Women's 57kg | —N/a | Bye | S M Noe (MYA); W 5–0 | N A Petecio (PHI); L 0–5 | 2nd place, silver medalist(s) |

== Cycling ==
=== Mountain biking ===
Cross country

| Athlete | Event | Seeding run | | Final | |
| Athlete | Event | Time | Rank | Time | Rank |
|---|---|---|---|---|---|
| Feri Yudoyono | Men's cross country | —N/a | | 01:13.51 | 1st place, gold medalist(s) |
| Zaenal Fanani | Men's cross country | —N/a | | 01:13.53 | 2nd place, silver medalist(s) |
| Ihza Muhammad | Men's cross country | —N/a | | 01:14.09 | 4 |
| Sayu Bella Sukma Dewi | Women's cross country | —N/a | | 01:13.48 | 1st place, gold medalist(s) |
| Dela Anjar Wulan | Women's cross country | —N/a | | 01:21.27 | 5 |
| Dara Latifah | Women's cross country | —N/a | | DNF | |
| Dara Latifah; Feri Yudoyono; Sayu Bella Sukma Dewi; Zaenal Fanani | Mixed cross country relay | —N/a | | 00:50.11 | 1st place, gold medalist(s) |

Eliminator

| Athlete | Event | Qualification | | Elimination heat | | Semi final | | Final | |
| Athlete | Event | Time | Rank | Time | Rank | Time | Rank | Time | Rank |
|---|---|---|---|---|---|---|---|---|---|
| Ihza Muhammad | Men's elimination | 01:16.23 | 10 Q | —N/a | 2 Q | —N/a | 2 Q | —N/a | 3rd place, bronze medalist(s) |
| Zaenal Fanani | Men's elimination | 01:13.63 | 8 Q | —N/a | 3 | Did not advance | | | |
| Dara Latifah | Women's elimination | 01:30.75 | 5 Q | —N/a | 1 Q | —N/a | 2 Q | —N/a | 1st place, gold medalist(s) |
| Sayu Bella Sukma Dewi | Women's elimination | 02:00.45 | 12 | DNS | | Did not advance | | | |

=== Road ===
| Athlete | Event | Time | Rank |
|---|---|---|---|
Men
| Terry Yudha Kusuma | Men's road criterium | 01:13.38 | 1st place, gold medalist(s) |
| Muhammad Andy Royan | Men's road criterium | 01:13.41 | 7 |
| Aiman Cahyadi | Men's road criterium | 01:15.14 | 9 |
| Aiman Cahyadi | Men's road individual mass start | 03:22.50 | 2nd place, silver medalist(s) |
| Odie Purnomo Setiawan | Men's road individual mass start | 03:24.08 | 7 |
| Muhammad Abdurrohman | Men's road individual mass start | 03:24.12 | 14 |
| Terry Yudha Kusuma | Men's road individual mass start | 03:24.12 | 14 |
| Bernard Van Aert | Men's road individual mass start | 03:32.32 | 27 |
Women
| Magh Firotika Marenda | Women's road criterium | 55.19 | 4 |
| Ayustina Delia Priatna | Women's road criterium | 55.19 | 8 |
| Dewika Mulya Sova | Women's road criterium | DNS | |

== Diving ==
Women

| Athlete | Event | Final | |
| Athlete | Event | Points | Rank |
|---|---|---|---|
| Gladies Lariesa Garina | Synchronized 3m springboard | 273.1000 | 2nd place, silver medalist(s) |
| Gladies Lariesa Garina | Synchronized 10m platform | 228.0000 | 3rd place, bronze medalist(s) |

== Endurance race ==
=== Aquathlon ===
Individual

| Athlete | Event | Final / BM | | | | |
| Athlete | Event | Swim (500m) | Trans 1 | Run 2 (2.5km) | Total time | Rank |
|---|---|---|---|---|---|---|
| Rashif Amila Yaqin | Men's individual | 00:05:53 | 00:00:24 | 00:08:11 | 00:14:28 | 1st place, gold medalist(s) |
| Aryandra Fauzi Mauludin | Men's individual | 00:06:24 | 00:00:29 | 00:10:15 | 00:17:08 | 8 |
| Dea Salsabila Putri | Women's individual | 00:06:34 | 00:00:25 | 00:10:34 | 00:17:33 | 3rd place, bronze medalist(s) |
| Binta Erlen Salsabela | Women's individual | 00:07:00 | 00:00:28 | 00:11:04 | 00:18:32 | 9 |

Mixed

| Athlete | Event | Final / BM | | | | | |
| Athlete | Event | Leg 1 | Leg 2 | Leg 3 | Leg 4 | Total time | Rank |
|---|---|---|---|---|---|---|---|
| Aloysius Reckyardo; Renata Berliana Aditya; Aryandra Fauzi Mauludin; Dea Salsabila Putri | Mixed team relay | 00:17.43 | 00:19.19 | 00:17.01 | 00:17.24 | 01:11.27 | 2nd place, silver medalist(s) |

=== Duathlon ===
Individual

| Athlete | Event | Final / BM | | | | | | |
| Athlete | Event | Run (5km) | Trans 1 | Bike (20km) | Trans 2 | Run 2 (2.5km) | Total time | Rank |
|---|---|---|---|---|---|---|---|---|
| Sedilta Pilon Nubatonis | Men's individual | 00:16:43 | 00:00:24 | 00:29:09 | 00:00:22 | 00:08:07 | 00:54:45 | 3rd place, bronze medalist(s) |
| Jauhari Johan | Men's individual | 00:16:43 | 00:00:22 | 00:29:12 | 00:00:25 | 00:08:12 | 00:54:54 | 4 |
| Maharani Azhri Wahyuningtyas | Women's individual | 00:20.12 | 00:00.25 | 00:34.21 | 00:00.34 | 00:10.42 | 01:06.14 | 3rd place, bronze medalist(s) |
| Zahra Bulan Aprillia Putri | Women's individual | DNF | | | | | | |

=== Triathlon ===
Individual

| Athlete | Event | Final / BM | | | | | | |
| Athlete | Event | swim (750m) | Trans 1 | Bike (20km) | Trans 2 | Run 2 (5km) | Total time | Rank |
|---|---|---|---|---|---|---|---|---|
| Rashif Amila Yaqin | Men's individual | 00:09:40 | 00:00:23 | 00:30:32 | 00:00:30 | 00:17:40 | 00:58:45 | 2nd place, silver medalist(s) |
| Aloysius Reckyardo Mardian | Men's individual | 00:09:57 | 00:00:26 | 00:30:12 | 00:00:32 | 00:21:16 | 01:02:23 | 7 |
| Zahra Bulan Aprillia Putri | Women's individual | 00:12.25 | 00:00.55 | 00:33.31 | 00:00.31 | 00:22.22 | 01:09.44 | 5 |
| Renata Berliana Aditya | Women's individual | 00:11.38 | 00:00.26 | 00:34.46 | 00:00.26 | 00:23.01 | 01:10.17 | 7 |

== Fencing ==
The Indonesian Fencing Team sent 7 athletes to compete in the 2023 SEA Games consisting of 6 male athletes and 1 female athletes.

=== Individual ===
| Athlete | Event | Preliminaries Pool | | Round of 16 | Quarterfinals | Semifinals | Finals | |
| Athlete | Event | Opponent Score | Seed | Opposition Score | Opposition Score | Opposition Score | Opposition Score | Rank |
|---|---|---|---|---|---|---|---|---|
| Ricky Dhisullimah | Individual sabre | P Phearin (CAM); W 5–1 | 4 Q | S G Quentin (LAO); W 15–9 | V Srinualnad (THA); L 9–15 | Did not advance | | |
| Ricky Dhisullimah | Individual sabre | S G Quentin (LAO); L 3–5 | 4 Q | S G Quentin (LAO); W 15–9 | V Srinualnad (THA); L 9–15 | Did not advance | | |
| Ricky Dhisullimah | Individual sabre | T Z Hou (MAS); W 5-3 | 4 Q | S G Quentin (LAO); W 15–9 | V Srinualnad (THA); L 9–15 | Did not advance | | |
| Ricky Dhisullimah | Individual sabre | P Wiriyatangsakul (THA); L 4–5 | 4 Q | S G Quentin (LAO); W 15–9 | V Srinualnad (THA); L 9–15 | Did not advance | | |
| Ricky Dhisullimah | Individual sabre | T A Vu (VIE); L 4–5 | 4 Q | S G Quentin (LAO); W 15–9 | V Srinualnad (THA); L 9–15 | Did not advance | | |
| Muhammad Irfandi Nurkamil | Individual sabre | N W H Loo (SGP); W 5–4 | 1 Q | M A D B Asahrin (BRU); L 8–15 | Did not advance | | | |
| Muhammad Irfandi Nurkamil | Individual sabre | M A D B Asahrin (BRU); W 5–4 | 1 Q | M A D B Asahrin (BRU); L 8–15 | Did not advance | | | |
| Muhammad Irfandi Nurkamil | Individual sabre | S Sinat (CAM); W 5–2 | 1 Q | M A D B Asahrin (BRU); L 8–15 | Did not advance | | | |
| Muhammad Irfandi Nurkamil | Individual sabre | E D E Villanueva (PHI); L 4–5 | 1 Q | M A D B Asahrin (BRU); L 8–15 | Did not advance | | | |
| Nuraya Kadafie | Individual épée | T N Nguyen (VIE); L 1–5 | 6 Q | N Singkham (THA); L 1–15 | Did not advance | | | |
| Nuraya Kadafie | Individual épée | S Saknuk (CAM); W 5–2 | 6 Q | N Singkham (THA); L 1–15 | Did not advance | | | |
| Nuraya Kadafie | Individual épée | I S K Xuan (MAS); L 3–5 | 6 Q | N Singkham (THA); L 1–15 | Did not advance | | | |
| Nuraya Kadafie | Individual épée | L E E Ergina (PHI); L 4–5 | 6 Q | N Singkham (THA); L 1–15 | Did not advance | | | |
| Nuraya Kadafie | Individual épée | S R Lee (SGP); L 2–5 | 6 Q | N Singkham (THA); L 1–15 | Did not advance | | | |
| Nuraya Kadafie | Individual épée | N Singkham (THA); L 1–5 | 6 Q | N Singkham (THA); L 1–15 | Did not advance | | | |
| Anggi Wiliansyah | Individual épée | P D Nguyen (VIE); L 4-5 | 6 Q | J T S To (SGP); L 13–14 | Did not advance | | | |
| Anggi Wiliansyah | Individual épée | K I Jie (MAS); L 3–5 | 6 Q | J T S To (SGP); L 13–14 | Did not advance | | | |
| Anggi Wiliansyah | Individual épée | V U F Paul (CAM); W 5–4 | 6 Q | J T S To (SGP); L 13–14 | Did not advance | | | |
| Anggi Wiliansyah | Individual épée | N G Jose (PHI); L 2–5 | 6 Q | J T S To (SGP); L 13–14 | Did not advance | | | |
| Anggi Wiliansyah | Individual épée | J T S To (SGP); L 3–5 | 6 Q | J T S To (SGP); L 13–14 | Did not advance | | | |
| Anggi Wiliansyah | Individual épée | K Jeungamnuaychai (THA); L 4–5 | 6 Q | J T S To (SGP); L 13–14 | Did not advance | | | |

=== Team ===
| Athlete | Event | Quarterfinals | Semifinals | Finals | |
| Athlete | Event | Opposition Score | Opposition Score | Opposition Score | Rank |
|---|---|---|---|---|---|
| Ricky Dhisullimah; Muhammad Irfandi Nurkamil; Dita Afriadi | Men's sabre team | Brunei (BRU); W 45–38 | Vietnam (VIE); L 32–45 | Did not advance | 3rd place, bronze medalist(s) |
| Anggi Wiliansyah; Indra Jaya Kusuma; Nuraya Kadafie | Men's épée team | Vietnam (VIE); L 23–45 | Did not advance | | |

== Football ==
The Indonesian football team only participated in the men's tournament, sending a total of 20 players in Football.

| Team | Event | Group stage | | | | | Semifinal | Final / BM | |
| Team | Event | Opposition Score | Opposition Score | Opposition Score | Opposition Score | Rank | Opposition Score | Opposition Score | Rank |
|---|---|---|---|---|---|---|---|---|---|
| Indonesia men's | Men's tournament | Philippines; W 3–0 | Myanmar; W 5–0 | Timor-Leste; W 3–0 | Cambodia; W 2–1 | 1 Q | Vietnam; W 3–2 | Thailand; W 5–2 (a.e.t.) | 1st place, gold medalist(s) |

Team roster
Head coach: Indra Sjafri

| No. | Pos. | Player | Date of birth (age) | Caps | Goals | Club |
|---|---|---|---|---|---|---|
| 1 | GK | Adi Satryo | 7 July 2001 (age 24) | | | (Football Association of Indonesia) PSIS Semarang |
| 20 | GK | Ernando Ari | 27 February 2002 (age 24) | | | (Football Association of Indonesia) Persebaya Surabaya |
| 2 | DF | Bagas Kaffa | 16 January 2002 (age 24) | | | (Football Association of Indonesia) Barito Putera |
| 3 | DF | Rio Fahmi | 6 October 2001 (age 24) | | | (Football Association of Indonesia) Persija Jakarta |
| 4 | DF | Komang Teguh | 28 April 2002 (age 24) | | | (Football Association of Indonesia) Borneo Samarinda |
| 5 | DF | Rizky Ridho (captain) | 21 November 2001 (age 24) | | | (Football Association of Indonesia) Persija Jakarta |
| 12 | DF | Pratama Arhan | 21 December 2001 (age 24) | | | (Japan Football Association) Tokyo Verdy |
| 13 | DF | Haykal Alhafiz | 24 March 2001 (age 25) | | | (Football Association of Indonesia) PSIS Semarang |
| 14 | DF | Fajar Fathur Rahman | 29 May 2002 (age 23) | | | (Football Association of Indonesia) Borneo Samarinda |
| 16 | DF | Muhammad Ferarri | 21 June 2003 (age 22) | | | (Football Association of Indonesia) Persija Jakarta |
| 19 | DF | Alfeandra Dewangga | 28 June 2001 (age 24) | | | (Football Association of Indonesia) PSIS Semarang |
| 6 | MF | Ananda Raehan | 17 December 2003 (age 22) | | | (Football Association of Indonesia) PSM Makassar |
| 7 | MF | Marselino Ferdinan | 9 September 2004 (age 21) | | | (Royal Belgian Football Association) Deinze |
| 8 | MF | Witan Sulaeman | 8 October 2001 (age 24) | | | (Football Association of Indonesia) Persija Jakarta |
| 10 | MF | Beckham Putra | 29 October 2001 (age 24) | | | (Football Association of Indonesia) Persib Bandung |
| 15 | MF | Taufany Muslihuddin | 24 March 2002 (age 24) | | | (Football Association of Indonesia) Borneo Samarinda |
| 9 | FW | Ramadhan Sananta | 27 November 2002 (age 23) | | | (Football Association of Indonesia) PSM Makassar |
| 11 | FW | Jeam Sroyer | 11 December 2002 (age 23) | | | (Football Association of Indonesia) Persik Kediri |
| 17 | FW | Irfan Jauhari | 31 January 2001 (age 25) | | | (Football Association of Indonesia) Persis Solo |
| 18 | FW | Titan Agung | 5 June 2001 (age 24) | | | (Football Association of Indonesia) Bhayangkara |

Group play

| Pos | Team | Pld | W | D | L | GF | GA | GD | Pts | Qualification |
|---|---|---|---|---|---|---|---|---|---|---|
| 1 | Indonesia | 4 | 4 | 0 | 0 | 13 | 1 | +12 | 12 | Advance to Semi-finals |
| 2 | Myanmar | 4 | 3 | 0 | 1 | 4 | 5 | −1 | 9 | Advance to Semi-finals |
| 3 | Cambodia (H) | 4 | 1 | 1 | 2 | 6 | 5 | +1 | 4 | |
| 4 | Timor-Leste | 4 | 1 | 0 | 3 | 3 | 8 | −5 | 3 | |
| 5 | Philippines | 4 | 0 | 1 | 3 | 1 | 8 | −7 | 1 | |

Source: FIFA
(H) Hosts
29 April 2023
16:00

| Indonesia | 3–0 | Philippines |
|---|---|---|
| Marselino 45'; Irfan 89'; Fajar 90+1' | Report |

Olympic Stadium, Phnom Penh
Attendance: 14,500
Referee: Rowan Arumughan (India)
4 May 2023
16:00

| Indonesia | 5–0 | Myanmar |
|---|---|---|
| Marselino 19'; Sananta 31' (pen.), 59'; Fajar 73'; Titan 87' | Report |

Olympic Stadium, Phnom Penh
Attendance: 1,652
Referee: Jumpei Iida (Japan)
7 May 2023
16:00

| Timor-Leste | 0–3 | Indonesia |
|---|---|---|
| | | Sananta 44'; Fajar 62', 74' |

Olympic Stadium, Phnom Penh
Referee: Nazmi Nasaruddin (Malaysia)
10 May 2023
19:00

| Cambodia | 1–2 | Indonesia |
|---|---|---|
| Sovannmakara 45+2' | Report | Titan 9'; Beckham 52' |

Olympic Stadium, Phnom Penh
Referee: Shen Yinhao (China)

Semi-final

13 May 2023
16:00

| Indonesia | 3–2 | Vietnam |
|---|---|---|
| Komang 9'; Ferarri 53'; Taufany 90+6' | Report | Nguyễn Văn Tùng 36'; Bagas 79' (o.g.) |

Olympic Stadium, Phnom Penh
Referee: Kim Hee-gon (South Korea)

Final

16 May 2023
19:30

| Indonesia | 5–2 (a.e.t.) | Thailand |
|---|---|---|
| Sananta 20', 45+3'; Irfan 94'; Fajar 107'; Beckham 120' | | Anan 65'; Yotsakorn 90+7' |

Olympic Stadium, Phnom Penh
Referee: Qasim Al-Hatmi (Oman)

== Hockey ==
=== Field Hockey ===
| Team | Event | Group Stage | | | | | Final / BM | |
| Team | Event | Opposition Score | Opposition Score | Opposition Score | Opposition Score | Rank | Opposition Score | Rank |
|---|---|---|---|---|---|---|---|---|
| Indonesia men's team | Men's tournament | Singapore; D 2–2 | Thailand; W 2–1 | Cambodia; W 4–0 | Malaysia; L 2–4 | 3 | Did not advance | 3rd place, bronze medalist(s) |
| Indonesia women's team | Women's tournament | Singapore; D 2–2 | Thailand; L 1–4 | Cambodia; D 0–0 | Malaysia; L 0–6 | 3 | Did not advance | 3rd place, bronze medalist(s) |

=== Indoor Hockey ===
| Team | Event | Group Stage | | | | | | Final / BM | |
| Team | Event | Opposition Score | Opposition Score | Opposition Score | Opposition Score | Opposition Score | Rank | Opposition Score | Rank |
|---|---|---|---|---|---|---|---|---|---|
| Indonesia men's team | Men's tournament | Singapore; W 7–0 | Thailand; W 3–0 | Philippines; W 20–0 | Cambodia; W 6–1 | Malaysia; L 2–3 | 2 Q | Malaysia; W 3–3 (2–1) (p) | 1st place, gold medalist(s) |
| Indonesia women's team | Women's tournament | Cambodia; W 7–1 | Singapore; W 4–0 | Philippines; W 14–1 | Thailand; L 2–3 | Malaysia; L 2–4 | 3 | Did not advance | 3rd place, bronze medalist(s) |

== Golf ==
The Indonesian Golf Team sent 7 athletes to compete in the 2023 SEA Games consisting of 4 male athletes and 3 female athletes

=== Individual ===
| Athlete | Event | Round 1 | Round 2 | Final Round | | |
| Athlete | Event | Score | Score | Score | To par | Rank |
|---|---|---|---|---|---|---|
| Rayhan Abdul Latief | Men's individual | 71 | 72 | 212 | −4 | 12 |
| Randy Arbenata Mohamad Bintang | Men's individual | 72 | 71 | 213 | −3 | 14 |
| Amadeus Christian Susanto | Men's individual | 73 | 69 | 217 | 1 | 18 |
| Jonathan Xavier Hartono | Men's individual | 74 | 68 | 213 | −3 | 13 |
| Elaine Widjaja | Women's individual | 72 | 73 | 215 | −1 | 7 |
| Kristina Natalia Yoko | Women's individual | 73 | 74 | 220 | 4 | 11 |
| Holly Victoria Halim | Women's individual | 75 | 72 | 222 | 6 | 12 |

=== Team ===
| Athlete | Event | Quarterfinal | Semifinal | Final | |
| Athlete | Event | Opposition Score | Opposition Score | Opposition Score | Rank |
|---|---|---|---|---|---|
| Rayhan Abdul Latief; Amadeus Christian Susanto; Jonathan Xavier Hartono; Randy Arbenata Mohamad Bintang | Men's team | Philippines (PHI); W 1.5*-1.5 | Vietnam (VIE); L 1-2 | Malaysia (MAS); W 3-0 | 3rd place, bronze medalist(s) |
| Elaine Widjaja; Kristina Natalia Yoko; Holly Victoria Halim | Women's team | Singapore (SGP); W 1*-1 | Malaysia (MAS); W 1*-1 | Thailand (THA); L 0-2 | 2nd place, silver medalist(s) |

== Judo ==
=== Men ===
| Athlete | Event | | | | | | | | | |
| Athlete | Event | Group stage | | | | Quarterfinals | Semifinals | Repechage | Final / BM | |
| Opposition Result | Opposition Result | Opposition Result | Opposition Result | Opposition Result | Opposition Result | Opposition Result | Opposition Result | Opposition Result | Opposition Result | Rank |
|---|---|---|---|---|---|---|---|---|---|---|
| Muhammad Jamil Reza | Men's -55kg | —N/a | | | | N H Thanh (VIE); L | Did not advance | | | |
| Muhammad Alfiansyah | Men's -60kg | —N/a | | | | P K Phok (CAM); W | S Sithisane (LAO); L | H R E Sutejo (MAS); W | Did not advance | 3rd place, bronze medalist(s) |
| Dewa Kadek Rama Warma Putra | Men's -66kg | G Volodymyr (CAM); W 1-0 | K Khounnivath (LAO); W 1-0 | S P Nakano (PHI); W 1-0 | Y Zhou (SGP); W 1-0 | —N/a | | | | 1st place, gold medalist(s) |
| Qori Amrullah Al Haq Nugraha | Men's -73kg | —N/a | | | | M Terada (THA); L | Did not advance | S Ng (SGP); W | Did not advance | 3rd place, bronze medalist(s) |

=== Women ===
| Athlete | Event | Quarterfinals | Semifinals | Repechage | Final / BM | |
| Athlete | Event | Opposition Result | Opposition Result | Opposition Result | Opposition Result | Rank |
|---|---|---|---|---|---|---|
| Shifa Aulia | Women's -44kg | T Z Lin (MYA); W | N N N An (VIE); L | A Y Rosali (MAS); W | Did not advance | 3rd place, bronze medalist(s) |
| Meli Marta Rosita | Women's -55kg | K Sreynich (CAM); W | W Muenjit (THA); L | L Thor (LAO); W | Did not advance | 3rd place, bronze medalist(s) |

=== Mixed ===
| Athlete | Event | Quarterfinals | Semifinals | Repechage | Final / BM | |
| Athlete | Event | Opposition Result | Opposition Result | Opposition Result | Opposition Result | Rank |
|---|---|---|---|---|---|---|
| Qori Amrullah Al Haq Nugraha; Syerina; I Komang Ardiarta; I Gede Agastya Darma Wardana; Maryam March Maharani; I Dewa Ayu Mira Widari | Mixed team | Malaysia (MAS); W 4-1 | Vietnam (VIE); L 3-4 | Myanmar (MYA); W 4-0 | Did not advance | 3rd place, bronze medalist(s) |

== Karate ==
=== Kumite ===
| Athlete | Event | Quarterfinals | Semifinals | Repechage | Final / BM | |
| Athlete | Event | Opposition Result | Opposition Result | Opposition Result | Opposition Result | Rank |
|---|---|---|---|---|---|---|
Men
| Ari Saputra | Men's -60kg | L Kouyhav (CAM); W 6-1 | J R O Macaalay (PHI); W 7-0 | —N/a | S S H Sankar (MAS); L 5-13 | 2nd place, silver medalist(s) |
| Tebing Hutapea | Men's -67kg | M S H Sofian (BRU); W 4-2 | V B Chrun (CAM); L 1-3 | Did not advance | | |
| Ignatius Joshua Kandou | Men's -75kg | —N/a | S Raghonathan (MAS); L 3-5 | P I L E Alejo (PHI); W 5-1 | Did not advance | 3rd place, bronze medalist(s) |
| Sandi Firmansyah | Men's -84kg | —N/a | M A A A Malik (MAS); W 5*-5 | —N/a | I C C Agustin (PHI); W 1-0 | 1st place, gold medalist(s) |
| Ari Saputra; Ignatius Joshua Kandou; Muhammad Tegar Januar; Sandi Firmansyah; Tebing Hutapea; Huggies Yustisio | Men's team | Philippines (PHI); W 3-0 | Vietnam (VIE); L 1-3 | Thailand (THA); W | Did not advance | 3rd place, bronze medalist(s) |
Women
| Cok Istri Agung Sanistyarani | Women's -55kg | L S Vicheka (CAM); W 8-0 | M Poovanesan (MAS); W 8-1 | —N/a | T M T Hoang (VIE); L 3-4 | 2nd place, silver medalist(s) |
| Ceyco Georgia Zefanya | Women's -68kg | Y Budklad (THA); W 2*-2 | T H Dinh (VIE); L 3-5 | Did not advance | | 3rd place, bronze medalist(s) |
| Dessyinta Rakawuni Banurea | Women's +68kg | K Songklin (THA); L 1-1* | Did not advance | A S Azlan (MAS); W 3-0 | Did not advance | 3rd place, bronze medalist(s) |
| Dessyinta Rakawuni Banurea; Devina Dea; Cok Istri Agung Sanistyarani; Ceyco Georgia Zefanya | Women's team | Thailand (THA); W 2-1 | Vietnam (VIE); L 1-2 | Cambodia (CAM); W 2-0 | Did not advance | 3rd place, bronze medalist(s) |

=== Kata ===
| Athlete | Event | 1st Round | | Final | |
| Athlete | Event | Opposition Result | Rank | Opposition Result | Rank |
|---|---|---|---|---|---|
| Ahmad Zigi Zaresta Yuda | Men's individual | —N/a | | M A Asmadie (MAS); W 39.6-39.4 | 1st place, gold medalist(s) |
| Albiadi Adi; Andy Tomy Aditya Mardana; Andi Dasril Dwi Dharmawan | Men's team | —N/a | | Vietnam (VIE); L 40.8-41 | 2nd place, silver medalist(s) |
| Krisda Putri Aprilia | Women's individual | —N/a | | K Rith (CAM); W 39.6-37.9 | 3rd place, bronze medalist(s) |
| Anugerah Nurul Lucky; Dian Monika Nababan; Emilia Sri Hanandyta | Women's team | —N/a | | Vietnam (VIE); L 39.7-41.4 | 2nd place, silver medalist(s) |

== Kickboxing ==
| Athlete | Event | Quarterfinals | Semifinals | Final | |
| Athlete | Event | Opposition Result | Opposition Result | Opposition Result | Rank |
|---|---|---|---|---|---|
Men
| Toni Kristian Hutapea | Men's Full Contact −54kg | —N/a | C V B Buminaang (PHI); W 3–0 | S Naksawad (THA); W 2–1 | 1st place, gold medalist(s) |
| Alfiandi | Men's Full Contact −60kg | S Taipanyavong (LAO); L 1–2 | Did not advance | | |
| Abdul Haris Sofyan | Men's Full Contact −67kg | Bye | V H Nguyen (VIE); W 2–1 | L Panha (CAM); L 0–3 | 2nd place, silver medalist(s) |
| Salmri Stendra Pattisamalo | Men's K1 −51kg | I Rumijam (MAS); W 3–0 | D F Chulipas (PHI); W 3–0 | S Sainet (CAM); L 0–3 | 2nd place, silver medalist(s) |
| Claudions Reco | Men's K1 −67kg | Bye | J G Pacitaw (PHI); L 1–2 | Did not advance | 3rd place, bronze medalist(s) |
| Abdul Aziz | Men's Kick Light −63kg | Bye | M Borin (CAM); W 2–1 | M H Tran (VIE); W 2–1 | 1st place, gold medalist(s) |
| Firman Muharram Syach | Men's Kick Light −69kg | Bye | P Sukyik (THA); W 2–1 | A N I H Rakib (MAS); L 1–2 | 2nd place, silver medalist(s) |
| David Leonardo | Men's Light Contact −63kg | Bye | K Wijitnavee (THA); L 1–2 | Did not advance | 3rd place, bronze medalist(s) |
| Riki Aditia | Men's Low Kick −51kg | V T Huynh (VIE); L 0–3 | Did not advance | | |
| Fransiskus Sinaga | Men's Low Kick −57kg | T Rachhan (CAM); L 0–3 | Did not advance | | |
| Fajar | Men's Low Kick −63.5kg | D Kyttanasilalack (LAO); L 0–3 | Did not advance | | |
| Marck Steward Rahasia | Men's Low Kick −71kg | H A Banario (PHI); L 0–3 | Did not advance | | |
Women
| Paula Rewade Saruke | Women's Full Contact −48kg | O Siphan (CAM); W 3–0 | R D Dacquel (PHI); L 1–2 | Did not advance | 3rd place, bronze medalist(s) |
| Aprilia Eka Putri | Women's K1 −52kg | Bye | H L Bui (VIE); L 0–3 | Did not advance | 3rd place, bronze medalist(s) |
| Diandra Ariesta Pieter | Women's Kick Light −55kg | Bye | T N N Nguyen (VIE); W 3–0 | G I Araos (PHI); W 3–0 | 1st place, gold medalist(s) |
| Fani Febriyanti | Women's Light Contact −50kg | R I N R Anuar (MAS); W 3–0 | T N Le (VIE); L 1–2 | Did not advance | 3rd place, bronze medalist(s) |
| Susanti Ndapataka | Women's Low Kick −56kg | Bye | T H Dinh (VIE); W 3–0 | G C D Paz (PHI); L 0–3 | 2nd place, silver medalist(s) |

== Kun bokator ==
=== Men ===
| Athlete | Event | Opposition Result | Rank |
|---|---|---|---|
| Dzaky Fadhlurrohman | Single Bare Hands Form | 7.50 | 3rd place, bronze medalist(s) |
| Gema Nur Arifin | Single Bamboo Shield Form | 7.67 | 3rd place, bronze medalist(s) |
| Alfadhila Ramadhan | Single Bokator Spirit Form | 7.66 | 2nd place, silver medalist(s) |
| Yazid Hanifam Kurniawan | Single Phkak Form | 7.3693 | 2nd place, silver medalist(s) |
| Gema Nur Arifin; Yazid Hanifam Kurniawan | Duo Performance | 8.6658 | 1st place, gold medalist(s) |
| Moch Martin Ramadhan; Sendiaga Putra; Teri Hidayat | Bare Hands Form | 8.7491 | 1st place, gold medalist(s) |

| Athlete | Event | Quarterfinals | Semifinals | Final / BM | |
| Athlete | Event | Opposition Result | Opposition Result | Opposition Result | Rank |
|---|---|---|---|---|---|
| Ade Permana | Men's combat 50kg | S Singsavath (LAO); W 3-0 | Q L Nguyen (VIE); W 2-1 | R S Catalan (PHI); L 0-3 | 2nd place, silver medalist(s) |
| Obaja Halomoan Sianturi | Men's combat 55kg | S Inthisah (LAO); W 2*-2 | D Nget (CAM); L 0-3 | Did not advance | 3rd place, bronze medalist(s) |
| Kamal Maulansyah | Men's combat 60kg | P Thalongsak (LAO); W 2-1 | V T Dang (VIE); W 2*-2 | C Chon (CAM); L 0-3 | 2nd place, silver medalist(s) |
| Yudi Cahyadi | Men's combat 65kg | —N/a | L Souliyavong (LAO); W 3-0 | V C Huynh (CAM); L 1-2 | 2nd place, silver medalist(s) |
| Samuel Frekson Wouw | Men's combat 70kg | —N/a | D Khieosavath (LAO); L 3-0 | Did not advance | 3rd place, bronze medalist(s) |

=== Women ===
| Athlete | Event | Opposition Result | Rank |
|---|---|---|---|
| Dwi Jayanti | Single Bare Hands Form | 6.83 | 3rd place, bronze medalist(s) |
| Dwi Jayanti | Single Phkak Form | 6.6660 | 5 |
| Daslya Anggraini | Single Bamboo Shield Form | 8.42 | 3rd place, bronze medalist(s) |
| Riana Oktavia | Single Bokator Spirit Form | 8.08 | 3rd place, bronze medalist(s) |
| Eny Tri Susilowati; Riana Oktavia; Riva Hijriah | Bare Hands Form | 8.4992 | 3rd place, bronze medalist(s) |

| Athlete | Event | Quarterfinals | Semifinals | Final / BM | |
| Athlete | Event | Opposition Result | Opposition Result | Opposition Result | Rank |
|---|---|---|---|---|---|
| Miftahul Jannah | Women's combat 45kg | A Kamkeo (LAO); W 2-1 | L Sreynith (CAM); L 0-3 | Did not advance | 3rd place, bronze medalist(s) |
| Diana Ratna Dewi | Women's combat 50kg | —N/a | A K M Mallari (PHI); L 1-2 | Did not advance | 3rd place, bronze medalist(s) |
| Selviah Pertiwi | Women's combat 55kg | —N/a | A K M Mallari (PHI); L 0-3 | Did not advance | 3rd place, bronze medalist(s) |
| Maylen Christy Aupe | Women's combat 60kg | —N/a | V S T Tran (VIE); L 1-3 | Did not advance | 3rd place, bronze medalist(s) |

Mixed

| Athlete | Event | Opposition Result | Rank |
|---|---|---|---|
| Desslya Anggraini; Moch Martin Ramadhan; Sendiaga Putra | Mixed 1 Women Defence Against 2 Men | 7.5826 | 3rd place, bronze medalist(s) |

== Obstacle race ==
| Athlete | Event | Elimination round | | | | | | Final / BM | |
| Athlete | Event | Run 1 | | Run 2 | | Best Time | Rank | Result | Rank |
| Athlete | Event | Time | Rank | Time | Rank | Best Time | Rank | Result | Rank |
|---|---|---|---|---|---|---|---|---|---|
| Fahrun | Men's individual | 0:44.468 | 8 | 0:44.024 | 5 | 0:44.024 | 8 | Did not advance | |
| Anggun Yolanda Samsul Hadi | Women's individual | 0:47.242 | 3 | 0:41.219 | 3 | 1:01.872 | 3QB | 0:39.598 | 3rd place, bronze medalist(s) |
| Mudji Mulyani | Women's individual | 1:20.541 | 4 | 1:20.541 | 5 | 1:20.541 | 5 | Did not advance | |
| Angga Cahya; Fahrun; Panji Mohamad Paisal; Putra Waluya Nuryayi | Men's team relay | 0:25.879 | 2 | 0:39.554 | 6 | 0:25.879 | 3B | 0:31.270 | 3rd place, bronze medalist(s) |
| Anggun Yolanda Samsul Hadi; Ayu Puspita Sari; Mudji Mulyani; Rahmayuna Fadillah | Women's team relay | 2:26.312 | 1 | 2:20.172 | 1 | 2:20.172 | 1QG | 0:35.060 | 2nd place, silver medalist(s) |

== Pencak silat ==
=== seni ===
| Athlete | Event | Round of 16 | Quarterfinal | Semifinal | Final | |
| Athlete | Event | Opposition Score | Opposition Score | Opposition Score | Opposition Score | Rank |
|---|---|---|---|---|---|---|
| Syarief Hidayatullah Suhaimi | Men's tunggal | E T Tacuel (PHI); W 9.960–9.925 | H T Pham (VIE); L 9.940–9.960 | Did not advance | | |
| Anggi Faisal Mubarok; Asep Yuldan Sani; Rano Slamet Nugraha | Men's regu | —N/a | Singapore (SIN); W 9.965–9.925 | Brunei Darussalam (BRU); W 9.965–9.910 | Thailand (THA); W 9.970–9.930 | 1st place, gold medalist(s) |
| Puspa Arumsari | Women's tunggal | —N/a | N Nanthavongsa (LAO); W 9.970–9.880 | S Nazurah (SGP); W 9.977–9.910 | N S Hamzah (MAS); W 9.970–9.915 | 1st place, gold medalist(s) |
| Ririn Rinasih; Riska Hermawan | Women's ganda | —N/a | | Malaysia (MAS); W 9.955–9.880 | Thailand (THA); L 9.915–9.945 | 2nd place, silver medalist(s) |

=== Tanding ===
| Athlete | Event | Quarterfinals | Semifinals | Final | |
| Athlete | Event | Opposition Result | Opposition Result | Opposition Result | Rank |
|---|---|---|---|---|---|
| Bayu Lesmana | Men's tanding class u45 | —N/a | Razali (SIN); W 31–15 | Non (CAM); L by WO | 2nd place, silver medalist(s) |
| Khoirudin Mustakim | Men's tanding class A | Taha (BRU); W 29–15 | Vorn (CAM); W 12–2 | Dumaan (PHI); W 43–25 | 1st place, gold medalist(s) |
| Muhammad Zaki Zikrillah | Men's tanding class B | Benitez (PHI); W 40–5 | Vu Nguyen (VIE); W 46–22 | Srakaew (THA); W 53–47 | 1st place, gold medalist(s) |
| Muhammad Yachser Arafa | Men's tanding class C | Vin (CAM); W 36–17 | Van Kien Vu (VIE); W 31–16 | Mitthasan (THA); L 40–49 | 2nd place, silver medalist(s) |
| Kadek Andrey Nova Prayada | Men's tanding class D | Bye | Bangoy (PHI); W 57–38 | Mazuki (MAS); L 33–39 | 2nd place, silver medalist(s) |
| Tito Hendra Septa Kurnia | Men's tanding class E | Vanthai (CAM); W 61–15 | Calo (PHI); W 45–21 | Pholkaew (THA); W 67–37 | 1st place, gold medalist(s) |
| Iqbal Candra Pratama | Men's tanding class F | A Razzaq (SIN); W 43–2 | Duc Hung (VIE); W 37–11 | Zeckry (MAS); W 53–9 | 1st place, gold medalist(s) |
| Ronaldo Neno | Men's tanding class I | Trinh (VIE); W 43–38 | Alauddin (SIN); L 20–21 | Did not advance | 3rd place, bronze medalist(s) |
| Suci Wulandari | Women's tanding class u45 | Loseng (THA); W 47–21 | Thi Kim (VIE); W 31–30 | Norsyakirah (MAS); L 33–36 | 2nd place, silver medalist(s) |
| Safira Dwi Meilani | Women's tanding class B | Sreynich (CAM); W 54–9 | Syazeera (MAS); W 46–39 | Hoang (VIE); W 61–43 | 1st place, gold medalist(s) |
| Jeni Elvis Kause | Women's tanding class C | —N/a | Sotheara (CAM); W 20–0 | Thi Cam (VIE); W 46–27 | 1st place, gold medalist(s) |
| Atifa Fismawati | Women's tanding class D | Thi Yen (VIE); W 32–22 | Badajos (PHI); W 4–0 | Shazwana (MAS); W 38–35 | 1st place, gold medalist(s) |
| Nia Larasati | Women's tanding class E | Bye | Vanita (CAM); W 46–10 | Thi Thu (VIE); L 48–50 | 2nd place, silver medalist(s) |

== Sepak takraw ==
| Athlete | Event | Group stage | | | | | Semifinals | Final / BM | |
| Athlete | Event | Oppositions Scores | Oppositions Scores | Oppositions Scores | Oppositions Scores | Rank | Opposition Score | Opposition Score | Rank |
|---|---|---|---|---|---|---|---|---|---|
| Muhammad Hardiansyah Muliang; Rusdi; Saiful Rijal | Men's double | Philippines (PHI); W 2-0 | Vietnam (VIE); W 2-0 | Laos (LAO); W 2-0 | —N/a | 1 Q | Myanmar (MYA); W 2-0 | Malaysia (MAS); W 2-1 | 1st place, gold medalist(s) |
| Muhammad Hardiansyah Muliang; Rusdi; Saiful Rijal; Andy Tri Sandi Saputra; Jelki Ladada; Anwar Budiyanto; Diky Apriyadi; Abdul Muin; Muhammad Hafidz | Men's team double | Philippines (PHI); W 3-0 | Vietnam (VIE); W 3-0 | —N/a | | 1 Q | Laos (LAO); W 2-0 | Myanmar (MYA); W 2-0 | 1st place, gold medalist(s) |
| Muhammad Hardiansyah Muliang; Rusdi; Saiful Rijal; Andy Tri Sandi Saputra; Diky Apriyadi; Muhammad Hafidz | Men's quadrant | Laos (LAO); W 2-1 | Singapore (SGP); W 2-0 | Vietnam (VIE); W 2-1 | —N/a | 1 Q | Cambodia (CAM); W 2-0 | Thailand (THA); L 0-2 | 2nd place, silver medalist(s) |
| Kusnelia; Lena; Fujy Anggy Lestari | Women's double | Vietnam (VIE); W 2-1 | Cambodia (CAM); W 2-0 | Laos (LAO); W 2-0 | Myanmar (MYA); L 1-2 | 3 | —N/a | | 3rd place, bronze medalist(s) |
| Kusnelia; Lena; Fitra Siu; Asmaaul Husna; Dita Pratiwi; Wan Annisa Rachmadi | Women's quadrant | Philippines (PHI); W 2-0 | Vietnam (VIE); L 0-2 | —N/a | | 2 Q | Thailand (THA); L 0-2 | Did not advance | 3rd place, bronze medalist(s) |

== Soft tennis ==
=== Men ===
| Athlete | Event | Group stage | | | | | Semifinals | Final / BM | |
| Athlete | Event | Oppositions Scores | Oppositions Scores | Oppositions Scores | Oppositions Scores | Rank | Opposition Score | Opposition Score | Rank |
|---|---|---|---|---|---|---|---|---|---|
| Muhammad Hemat Bhakti Anugerah | Single | J D C D Araujo (TLS); W 4-0 | Orn Sambath (CAM); W 4-1 | —N/a | | 1 Q | —N/a | J A Arcilla (PHI); L 1-4 | 2nd place, silver medalist(s) |
| Fernando Sanger; Mario Harley Alibasa; Muhammad Hemat Bhakti Anugerah; Sunu Wahyu Trijati; Tio Juliandi Hutauruk | Team | Cambodia (CAM); W 2-1 | Laos (LAO); W 3-0 | Philippines (PHI); L 1-2 | Thailand (THA); L 1-2 | 4 Q | Cambodia (CAM); W 2-1 | Thailand (THA); W 2-1 | 1st place, gold medalist(s) |

=== Women ===
| Athlete | Event | Group stage | | | | | Semifinals | Final / BM | |
| Athlete | Event | Oppositions Scores | Oppositions Scores | Oppositions Scores | Oppositions Scores | Rank | Opposition Score | Opposition Score | Rank |
|---|---|---|---|---|---|---|---|---|---|
| Dwi Rahayu Putri | Single | S Hachnolath (LAO); W 4-0 | H Sreypov (CAM); W 4-0 | —N/a | | 1 Q | —N/a | N C C Z Manalac (PHI); W 4-3 | 1st place, gold medalist(s) |
| Siti Nur Arasy; Voni Darlina; Sharon Carnelia Watupongoh; Dwi Rahayu Putri; Allif Naffiah | Double | C Chheavhuoy; K Mengchoung (CAM); W 5-1 | N C C Z Manalac; P L M A Catindig (PHI); L 1-5 | —N/a | | 2 | Did not advance | | 3rd place, bronze medalist(s) |
| Siti Nur Arasy; Voni Darlina; Sharon Carnelia Watupongoh; Dwi Rahayu Putri; Allif Naffiah | Team | Cambodia (CAM); W 2-1 | Laos (LAO); W 3-0 | Philippines (PHI); L 1-2 | Thailand (THA); W 2-1 | 2 Q | Thailand (THA); W 2-1 | Philippines (PHI); L 0-3 | 2nd place, silver medalist(s) |

== Swimming ==
=== Men ===
| Athlete | Event | Heats | | Final | |
| Athlete | Event | Result | Rank | Result | Rank |
|---|---|---|---|---|---|
| Erick Ahmad Fathoni | 50 m freestyle | 00:23.890 | 3 | Did not advance | |
| Joe Aditya Wijaya Kurniawan | 50 m freestyle | 00:23.410 | 3 Q | 00:23.540 | 8 |
| Joe Aditya Wijaya Kurniawan | 100 m freestyle | 00:51.050 | 3 Q | 00:50.730 | 6 |
| Erick Ahmad Fathoni | 100 m freestyle | 00:52.110 | 5 | Did not advance | |
| Nicholas Karel Subagyo | 200 m freestyle | 01:53.070 | 5 Q | 01:51.740 | 6 |
| Joe Aditya Wijaya Kurniawan | 200 m freestyle | 01:57.200 | 5 | Did not advance | |
| Mochammad Akbar Putra Taufik | 400 m freestyle | 04:06.160 | 5 | Did not advance | |
| Mochammad Akbar Putra Taufik | 1500 m freestyle | 16:24.430 | 2 | Did not advance | |
| Nicholas Karel Subagyo | 1500 m freestyle | 15:53.220 | 5 | Did not advance | |
| I Gede Siman Sudartawa | 50 m backstroke | 00:26.120 | 2 Q | 00:26.160 | 1st place, gold medalist(s) |
| Farrel Armandio Tangkas | 50 m backstroke | 00:26.540 | 2 Q | 00:26.290 | 5 |
| Farrel Armandio Tangkas | 100 m backstroke | 00:57.410 | 3 Q | 00:55.800 | 2nd place, silver medalist(s) |
| Romeo Lingga Alfarizi | 100 m backstroke | 00:57.970 | 4 Q | 00:58.01 | 8 |
| Romeo Lingga Alfarizi | 200 m backstroke | 02:07.170 | 2 Q | 02:08.150 | 8 |
| Farrel Armandio Tangkas | 200 m backstroke | 02:05.710 | 2 Q | 02:03.090 | 6 |
| Felix Viktor Ibele | 50 m breaststroke | 00:27.560 GR | 1 Q | 00:27.700 | 1st place, gold medalist(s) |
| Muhammad Dwiky Raharjo | 50 m breaststroke | 00:28:680 | 3 Q | 00:28.010 | 3rd place, bronze medalist(s) |
| Muhammad Dwiky Raharjo | 100 m breaststroke | 01:02.830 | 3 Q | 01:02.250 | 4 |
| Muhammad Dwiky Raharjo | 200 m breaststroke | 02:19:500 | 2 Q | 00:16.970 | 4 |
| Pande Made Iron Digjaya | 200 m breaststroke | 02:23:990 | 5 | Did not advance | |
| Shobrul Malikil Alim | 50 m butterfly | 00:26.030 | 6 | Did not advance | |
| Joe Aditya Wijaya Kurniawan | 50 m butterfly | 00:24.270 | 2 Q | 00:24.330 | 5 |
| Joe Aditya Wijaya Kurniawan | 100 m butterfly | 00:53.720 | 2 Q | 00:53.170 | 4 |
| Shobrul Malikil Alim | 100 m butterfly | 00:55.890 | 6 | Did not advance | |
| Shobrul Malikil Alim | 200 m butterfly | 02:05.420 | 4 Q | 02:05.460 | 7 |
| Shobrul Malikil Alim | 200 m individual medley | 02:14.280 | 5 | Did not advance | |
| Shobrul Malikil Alim | 400 m individual medley | | | 04:47.240 | 7 |
| Erick Ahmad Fathoni; Joe Aditya Wijaya Kurniawan; Mochammad Akbar Putra Taufik; Nicholas Karel Subagyo | 4x100 m freestyle relay | —N/a | | 03:40.32 | 7 |
| Erick Ahmad Fathoni; Joe Aditya Wijaya Kurniawan; Mochammad Akbar Putra Taufik; Nicholas Karel Subagyo | 4x200 m freestyle relay | —N/a | | 07:33.570 | 5 |
| Erick Ahmad Fathoni; Joe Aditya Wijaya Kurniawan; Mochammad Akbar Putra Taufik; Nicholas Karel Subagyo | 4x100 m medley relay | —N/a | | 03:41.920 | 3rd place, bronze medalist(s) |

=== Women ===
| Athlete | Event | Heats | | Final | |
| Athlete | Event | Result | Rank | Result | Rank |
|---|---|---|---|---|---|
| Philomena Balinda Arkananta | 50 m freestyle | 00:26.970 | 5 | Did not advance | |
| Angel Gabriela Yus | 50 m freestyle | 00:27.390 | 5 | Did not advance | |
| Angel Gabriela Yus | 100 m freestyle | 00:58.600 | 3 Q | 00:58.360 | 7 |
| Serenna Karmelita Muslim | 100 m freestyle | 01:00.040 | 5 Q | 00:58.880 | 8 |
| Serenna Karmelita Muslim | 200 m freestyle | 02:10.020 | 5 | Did not advance | |
| Prada Hanan Farmadini | 200 m freestyle | 02:07.950 | 4 Q | 02:06.690 | 5 |
| Michelle Surjadi Fang | 400 m freestyle | 04:41.340 | 5 | Did not advance | |
| Michelle Surjadi Fang | 800 m freestyle | 09:47.370 | 9 | 09:47.370 | 9 |
| Adelia | 50 m breaststroke | 00:33.670 | 5 | Did not advance | |
| Nurita Monica Sari | 50 m breaststroke | 00:32.910 | 4 Q | 00:33.670 | 8 |
| Nurita Monica Sari | 100 m breaststroke | 01:12.930 | 5 | 01:12.870 | 6 |
| Adelia | 100 m breaststroke | 01:13.240 | 5 Q | 01:12.930 | 7 |
| Adelia | 200 m breaststroke | 02:37.420 | 3 Q | 02:35.480 | 4 |
| Gusti Ayu Made Nadya Saraswati | 200 m breaststroke | 02:46.920 | 5 Q | 02:46.990 | 8 |
| Masniari Wolf | 50 m backstroke | 00:29.340 | 2 Q | 00:28.890 | 1st place, gold medalist(s) |
| Flairene Candrea Wonomiharjo | 50 m backstroke | 00:29.960 | 2 Q | 00:29.950 | 7 |
| Angel Gabriella Yus | 100 m backstroke | 01:03.260 | 2 Q | 01:03.710 | 3rd place, bronze medalist(s) |
| Flairene Candrea Wonomiharjo | 100 m backstroke | 01:04.470 | 2 Q | 01:04.630 | 5 |
| Flairene Candrea Wonomiharjo | 200 m backstroke | 02:25.370 | 4 | Did not advance | |
| Azzahra Permatahani | 200 m backstroke | 02:22.690 | 2 Q | 02:20.920 | 5 |
| Angel Gabriella Yus | 50 m butterfly | 02:28.770 | 3 Q | No result | |
| Gusti Ayu Made Nadya Saraswati | 50 m butterfly | 00:28.990 | 6 | Did not advance | |
| Gusti Ayu Made Nadya Saraswati | 100 m butterfly | 01:05.190 | 6 | Did not advance | |
| Azzahra Permatahani | 100 m butterfly | 01:02.780 | 3 Q | 01:02.450 | 7 |
| Azzahra Permatahani | 200 m butterfly | —N/a | | 02:16.010 | 4 |
| Adinda Kusumah Ningrum | 200 m butterfly | 02:18.260 | 6 | Did not advance | |
| Azzahra Permatahani; Philomena Balinda Arkananta; Serenna Karmelita Muslim; Angel Gabriella Yus | 4x100 freestyle relay | —N/a | | 03:54.030 | 4 |
| Azzahra Permatahani; Philomena Balinda Arkananta; Serenna Karmelita Muslim; Prada Hanan Farmadini | 4x200 freestyle relay | —N/a | | 08:37.210 | 5 |
| Adellia; Angel Gabriella Yus; Azzahra Permatahani; Serenna Karmelita Muslim | 4x200 medley relay | —N/a | | 04:17.880 | 4 |

=== Mixed ===
| Athlete | Event | Heats | | Final | |
| Athlete | Event | Result | Rank | Result | Rank |
|---|---|---|---|---|---|
| Angel Gabriella Yus; Azzahra Permatahani; Joe Aditya Wijaya Kurniawan; Muhammad Dwiky Raharjo | 4x100 medley relay | —N/a | | 03:59.400 | 4 |

== Table tennis ==
=== Individual ===
| Athlete | Event | Group stage | | | | Quarterfinals | Semifinals | Final / BM | |
| Athlete | Event | Oppositions Scores | Oppositions Scores | Oppositions Scores | Rank | Opposition Score | Oppositions Scores | Opposition Score | Rank |
|---|---|---|---|---|---|---|---|---|---|
| Rafanael Nikola Niman | Men's single | P Tanviriyavechakul (THA); L 0-3 (6-11, 7-11, 6-11) | P Kongphet (LAO); W 3-0 (11-7, 11-6, 11-8) | C Z Y Chew (SGP); L 0-3 (6-11, 7-11, 11-8, 7-11) | 3 | Did not advance | | | |
| Hafidh Nuur Annafi | Men's single | P Sanguansin (THA); L 0-3 (5-11, 9-11, 8-11) | A Vongsa (LAO); W 3-0 (11-3, 11-8, 11-8) | L C Feng (MAS); L 0-3 (3-11, 3-11, 7-11) | 3 | Did not advance | | | |
| Siti Aminah | Women's single | O Paranang (THA); L 0-3 (3-11, 1-11, 2-11) | K D K Nguyen (VIE); L 1-3 (13-11, 6-11, 4-11, 9-11) | —N/a | 3 | Did not advance | | | |
| Novida Widarahman | Women's single | J Zhou (SGP); L 0-3 (2-11, 11-13, 4-11) | H Ying (MAS); L 0-3 (6-11, 4-11, 4-11) | E R D P Dael (PHI); W 3-1 (7-11, 11-8, 11-9, 11-7) | 3 | Did not advance | | | |

=== Team ===
| Athlete | Event | Round of 16 | Quarterfinals | Semifinals | Final / BM | |
| Athlete | Event | Oppositions Scores | Oppositions Scores | Oppositions Scores | Opposition Score | Rank |
|---|---|---|---|---|---|---|
| Rafanael Nikola Niman; Hafidh Nuur Annafi | Men's double | A T Nguyen; D T Nguyen (VIE); L 1-3 | Did not advance | | | |
| Siti Aminah; Novida Widarahman | Women's double | J Sawettabut; T Khetkhuan (THA); L 0-3 | Did not advance | | | |

== Taekwondo ==
Kyorugi

| Athlete | Event | Quarterfinal | Semifinal | Final | |
| Athlete | Event | Opposition Score | Opposition Score | Opposition Score | Rank |
|---|---|---|---|---|---|
Men
| Thoriq Muhammad Hafidz | Men's 58 kg | F C P Thai (MAS); L 0-2 | Did not advance | | |
| Muhammad Bassam Raihan | Men's 63kg | M Sophorl (CAM); W 2-0 | D Q Pham (CAM); L 0-2 | Did not advance | 3rd place, bronze medalist(s) |
| Adam Yazid Ferdyansyah | Men's 68kg | Q T Ngo (VIE); W 2-1 | Chaichon Cho (THA); W 2-0 | Did not advance | 3rd place, bronze medalist(s) |
| Osanando Naufal Khairudin | Men's 80kg | Bye | S Phommavanh (LAO); W 2-0 | M S Zuber (MAS); L 1-2 | 2nd place, silver medalist(s) |
| Nicholas Armanto | Men's −87kg | —N/a | P Soucheng (CAM); W 2-0 | S T H B Morrison (PHI); L 1-2 | 2nd place, silver medalist(s) |
Women
| Ni Kadek Heni Prikasih | Women's 46kg | —N/a | V F Garces (PHI); W 2-0 | J Khantikulanon (THA); L 0-2 | 2nd place, silver medalist(s) |
| Megawati Tamesti Maheswari | Women's 53kg | Bye | M Julie (CAM); W 2-0 | C Jongkolrattanawattana (THA); W 2-1 | 1st place, gold medalist(s) |
| Aqila Aulia Ramadani | Women's 57kg | T D Vu (VIE); L 1-2 | Did not advance | | |
| Silvana Lamanda | Women's 67kg | —N/a | T K Bac (VIE); L 1-2 | Did not advance | 3rd place, bronze medalist(s) |
| Dinda Putri Lestari | Women's 73kg | —N/a | T H Nguyen (VIE); L 0-2 | Did not advance | 3rd place, bronze medalist(s) |

Poomsae

| Athlete | Event | Final | |
| Athlete | Event | Result | Rank |
|---|---|---|---|
| Wawan Saputra | Men's freestyle individual | 6.88 | 2nd place, silver medalist(s) |

== Tennis ==
The Indonesian Tennis Team sent 10 athletes to compete in the 2023 SEA Games consisting of 5 male athletes and 5 female athletes

=== Men ===
| Athlete | Event | Round of 16 | Quarter-finals | Semifinals | Final | |
| Athlete | Event | Opposition Score | Opposition Score | Opposition Score | Opposition Score | Rank |
|---|---|---|---|---|---|---|
| Muhammad Rifqi Fitriadi | Singles | M Eala (PHI); W 6–3, 6–1 | L G Trinh (VIE); W 6–2, 6–1 | K Samrej (THA); W 7–5, 2–6, [6–3] | L H Nam (VIE); W 6–4, 6–1 | 1st place, gold medalist(s) |
| Anthony Susanto | Singles | H H Zaw (MYA); W 6–2, 6–1 | L H Nam (VIE); L 1–6, 4–6 | Did not advance | | |
| Anthony Susanto; David Susanto | Doubles | I Daniel; S Darrshan (MAS); W 7–5, 4–6, [10–5] | F C B Alcantara; R A Gonzales (PHI); L 3–6, 5–7 | Did not advance | | |
| Christopher Rungkat; Nathan Anthony Barki | Doubles | B Kenny; L Sarinreach (CAM); W 6–4, 6–2 | E J R Olivarez; M Eala (PHI); W 7–5, 2–6, [10–5] | E J R Olivarez; M Eala (PHI); W 6–2, 7–6 | F C B Alcantara; R A Gonzales (PHI); L 6–2, 5–7, [5–10] | 2nd place, silver medalist(s) |
| Christopher Rungkat; Muhammad Rifqi Fitriadi; Nathan Anthony Barki; David Agung Susanto | Team | —N/a | Laos (LAO); W 2–0 | Vietnam (VIE); L 1–2 | Did not advance | 3rd place, bronze medalist(s) |

=== Women ===
| Athlete | Event | Round of 16 | Quarter-finals | Semifinals | Final | |
| Athlete | Event | Opposition Score | Opposition Score | Opposition Score | Opposition Score | Rank |
|---|---|---|---|---|---|---|
| Priska Madelyn Nugroho | Singles | K Andrea (CAM); W 6–3, 6–0 | Y S A Tong (SGP); W 6–1, 6–0 | A Chanta (THA); W 6–1, 4–6, [6–4] | L Tararudee (THA); W 6–7, 7–6, [7–5] | 1st place, gold medalist(s) |
| Fitriana Sabrina | Singles | H H Wai (MYA); W 6–2, 6–1 | L Tararudee (THA); L 3–6, 2–6 | Did not advance | | |
| Aldila Sutjiadi; Jessy Rompies | Doubles | Bye | K R Iglupas; S H D Rivera (PHI); L 0–6, 1–6 | L Tararudee; P Kovapitukted (THA); W 6–2, 4–6, [10–4] | L Kumkhum; P Plipuech (THA); L 4–6, 6–7 | 2nd place, silver medalist(s) |
| Beatrice Gumulya; Fitriana Sabrina | Doubles | S Leong; Z L Xuan (MAS); W 6–2, 6–1 | H H Wai; T Zoun (MYA); W 6–0, 6–1 | L Kumkhum; P Plipuech (THA); L 1–6, 0–6 | Did not advance | 3rd place, bronze medalist(s) |
| Aldila Sutjiadi; Priska Madelyn Nugroho; Jessy Rompies; Beatrice Gumulya | Team | —N/a | Philippines (PHI); W 2–0 | Cambodia (CAM); W 2–0 | Thailand (THA); W 2–1 | 1st place, gold medalist(s) |

=== Mixed ===
| Athlete | Event | Round of 16 | Quarterfinals | Semifinals | Final | |
| Athlete | Event | Opposition Score | Opposition Score | Opposition Score | Opposition Score | Rank |
|---|---|---|---|---|---|---|
| Christopher Rungkat; Aldila Sutjiadi | Doubles | Bye | M D Pathummakuronen; S Simmalavong (LAO); W 6–2, 6–4 | L Kumkhum; T Suksumran (THA); W 7–6, 5–4 | P Plipuech; P Isaro (THA); W 2–6, 6–4, [10–5] | 1st place, gold medalist(s) |
| David Agung Susanto; Beatrice Gumulya | Doubles | H L Kyaw; H H Myint (MYA); W 6–1, 6–2 | F C B Alcantara; M J S Capadocia (PHI); W 4–6, 6–2, [10–7] | P Plipuech; P Isaro (THA); L 0–6, 0–2, | Did not advance | 3rd place, bronze medalist(s) |

== Teqball (demonstration) ==
Men

| Athlete | Event | Group stage | | | | Semifinals | Final / BM | |
| Athlete | Event | Oppositions Scores | Oppositions Scores | Oppositions Scores | Rank | Opposition Score | Opposition Score | Rank |
|---|---|---|---|---|---|---|---|---|
| Yoga Ardika Putra | Singles | M F M Farhan (SGP); W 2-0 | A B B S Hameed (MAS); W 2-1 | H Sambo (CAM); L 0-2 | 1 Q | M A Escamillan (PHI); W 2-1 | Riem Sokphirom (CAM); L 1-1 (14-16) | 2nd place, silver medalist(s) |
| Bendiktus Budi Setyoko; Husni Uba | Doubles | M F B M Faizal; M F K B F Khan (SGP); W 2-0 | A H B Saidin; M A B Jamaludin (BRU); W 2-0 | R Sokphirom; S Ravi (CAM); W 2-0 | 1 Q | B Thuonvireak; O Ravy (CAM); L 1-2 | R Sokphirom; S Ravi (CAM); L 0-2 | 4 |

Women

| Athlete | Event | Group stage | | | | Semifinals | Final / BM | |
| Athlete | Event | Oppositions Scores | Oppositions Scores | Oppositions Scores | Rank | Opposition Score | Opposition Score | Rank |
|---|---|---|---|---|---|---|---|---|
| Yunita Indria | Singles | S A B Zamri (MAS); L 1-2 | N Chanboramey (CAM); W 2-0 | B S M S S N Amanina (SGP); L 0-2 | 3 Q | S A B Zamri (MAS); W 2-1 | B S M S S N Amanina (SGP); L 0-2 | 2nd place, silver medalist(s) |

== Volleyball ==
The Indonesian Volleyball Team sent 4 teams consisting of a men's indoor and beach volleyball teams and a wen's indoor and beach volleyball teams. For Indoor, each team consists of 14 athletes and for beach, each team consists of 4 athletes to compete in 2023 Southeast Asian Games

=== Beach ===
| Team | Event | Preliminary round | | | | Semi finals | Finals / BM | |
| Team | Event | Opposition Score | Opposition Score | Opposition Score | Rank | Opposition Score | Opposition Score | Rank |
|---|---|---|---|---|---|---|---|---|
| Danangsyah Yudistira Pribadi; Gilang Ramadhan; Bintang Akbar; Muhammad Ashfiya | Men's team | Malaysia (MAS); W 2–0 | Thailand (THA); W 2–1 | Singapore (SIN); W 2–0 | 1 Q | Philippines (PHI); W 2–0 | Thailand (THA); W 2–1 | 1st place, gold medalist(s) |
| Desi Ratnasari; Dhita Juliana; Nur Atika Sari; Yokebed Purari Eka | Women's team | Singapore (SIN); W 2–0 | Cambodia (CAM); W 2–0 | —N/a | 1 Q | Vietnam (VIE); W 2–0 | Thailand (THA); L 1–2 | 2nd place, silver medalist(s) |

=== Indoor ===
==== Men's tournament ====
| Team | Event | Group stage | | Semifinals / Pl. | Final / BM / Pl. | |
| Team | Event | Oppositions Scores | Rank | Opposition Score | Opposition Score | Rank |
|---|---|---|---|---|---|---|
| Indonesia men's | Men's tournament | Philippines; W 3–0 Singapore; W 3–0; Cambodia; W 3–0 | 1 Q | Vietnam; W 3–0 | Cambodia; W 3–0 | 1st place, gold medalist(s) |

Group A

| Pos | Team | Pld | W | L | Pts | SW | SL | SR | SPW | SPL | SPR | Qualification |
|---|---|---|---|---|---|---|---|---|---|---|---|---|
| 1 | Indonesia | 3 | 3 | 0 | 9 | 9 | 0 | MAX | 229 | 159 | 1.440 | Semifinals |
| 2 | Cambodia (H) | 3 | 2 | 1 | 6 | 6 | 3 | 2.000 | 205 | 181 | 1.133 | Semifinals |
| 3 | Singapore | 3 | 1 | 2 | 3 | 3 | 6 | 0.500 | 173 | 216 | 0.801 | 5th–8th semifinals |
| 4 | Philippines | 3 | 0 | 3 | 0 | 0 | 9 | 0.000 | 174 | 225 | 0.773 | 5th–8th semifinals |

(H) Host

Roster

Indonesia
- Fahry Putratama
- Hendra Kurniawan
- Henry Ade Novian
- Fahreza Abhinaya
- Muhammad Malizi
- Hernanda Zulfi
- Yuda Mardiansyah Putra
- Rivan Nurmulki
- Farhan Halim
- Dio Zulfikri
- Nizar Julfikar (c)
- Agil Angga Anggara
- Doni Haryono
- Boy Arnez

==== Women's tournament ====
| Team | Event | Group stage | | Semifinals / Pl. | Final / BM / Pl. | |
| Team | Event | Oppositions Scores | Rank | Opposition Score | Opposition Score | Rank |
|---|---|---|---|---|---|---|
| Indonesia women's | Women's tournament | Thailand; L 0–3; Malaysia; W 3–0; Myanmar; W 3–0 | 2 Q | Vietnam; L 2–3 | Philippines; W 3–1 | 3rd place, bronze medalist(s) |

Group A

| Pos | Team | Pld | W | L | Pts | SW | SL | SR | SPW | SPL | SPR | Qualification |
|---|---|---|---|---|---|---|---|---|---|---|---|---|
| 1 | Thailand | 3 | 3 | 0 | 9 | 9 | 0 | MAX | 225 | 111 | 2.027 | Semifinals |
| 2 | Indonesia | 3 | 2 | 1 | 6 | 6 | 3 | 2.000 | 198 | 141 | 1.404 | Semifinals |
| 3 | Malaysia | 3 | 1 | 2 | 3 | 3 | 6 | 0.500 | 149 | 193 | 0.772 | 5th–8th semifinals |
| 4 | Myanmar | 3 | 0 | 3 | 0 | 0 | 9 | 0.000 | 98 | 225 | 0.436 | 5th–8th semifinals |

Roster

Indonesia
- Nandita Salsabila
- Ratri Wulandari
- Megawati Hangestri Pertiwi
- Tisya Amallya Putri
- Shintia Alliva Mauludina
- Arneta Putri Amelian
- Wilda Nurfadhilah
- Agustin Wulandhari
- Hany Budiarti
- Mediol Stiovanny Yoku
- Yulis Indahyani
- Aulia Suci Nurfadilla

== Water polo ==
=== Men ===
| Team | Event | Round robin | | | | | |
| Team | Event | Opposition Score | Opposition Score | Opposition Score | Opposition Score | Opposition Score | Rank |
|---|---|---|---|---|---|---|---|
| Indonesia men's team | Men's team | Cambodia (CAM); W 37–2 | Malaysia (MAS); W 14–6 | Philippines (PHI); W 12–6 | Singapore (SGP); L 5–12 | Thailand (THA); W 12–9 | 2nd place, silver medalist(s) |

=== Women ===
| Team | Event | Round robin | | |
| Team | Event | Opposition Score | Opposition Score | Rank |
|---|---|---|---|---|
| Indonesia women's team | Women's team | Singapore (SGP); L 6–10 | Thailand (THA); L 8–17 | 3rd place, bronze medalist(s) |

== Weightlifting ==
The Indonesian Weightlifting Team sent 12 athletes to compete in the 2023 Southeast Asian Games consisting of 6 male athletes and 6 female athletes

Men

| Athlete | Event | Snatch | | Clean & jerk | | Total | Rank |
| Athlete | Event | Result | Rank | Result | Rank | Total | Rank |
|---|---|---|---|---|---|---|---|
| Muhammad Husni | −55 kg | 113 | 3 | 120 | 3 | 233 | 3rd place, bronze medalist(s) |
| Eko Yuli Irawan | −61 kg | 133 | 1 | 170 GR | 1 | 303 | 1st place, gold medalist(s) |
| Mohammad Yasin | −67 kg | 137 | 2 | 167 | 3 | 304 | 3rd place, bronze medalist(s) |
| Rizki Juniansyah | −73 kg | 156 GR | 1 | 191 GR | 1 | 347 GR | 1st place, gold medalist(s) |
| Rahmat Erwin Abdullah | −81 kg | 158 GR | 1 | 201 GR | 1 | 359 GR | 1st place, gold medalist(s) |
| Muhammad Zul Ilmi | −89 kg | 145 | 2 | 183 | 2 | 328 | 2nd place, silver medalist(s) |

Women

| Athlete | Event | Snatch | | Clean & jerk | | Total | Rank |
| Athlete | Event | Result | Rank | Result | Rank | Total | Rank |
|---|---|---|---|---|---|---|---|
| Luluk Diana Tri Wijayana | −49 kg | 78 | 2 | 95 | 3 | 173 | 3rd place, bronze medalist(s) |
| Juliana Klarisa | −55 kg | 81 | 2 | 105 | 1 | 186 | 1st place, gold medalist(s) |
| Sarah | −59 kg | 89 | 4 | 114 | 3 | 203 | 4 |
| Tsabitha Alfiah Ramadani | −64 kg | 97 | 1 | 107 | 1 | 204 | 1st place, gold medalist(s) |
| Restu Anggi | −71 kg | 91 | 3 | 115 | 3 | 206 | 3rd place, bronze medalist(s) |
| Nurul Akmal | +71 kg | 115 | 2 | 148 | 2 | 246 | 2nd place, silver medalist(s) |
