= Timor-Leste at the 2023 SEA Games =

Timor-Leste at the 2023 Southeast Asian Games
- IOC code: TLS
- NOC: National Olympic Committee of Timor Leste

in Phnom Penh, Cambodia
- Competitors: 90
- Flag bearer: Felisberto de Deus (athletics)
- Medals Ranked 11th: Gold 0 Silver 0 Bronze 8 Total 8

Southeast Asian Games appearances (overview)
- 2003; 2005; 2007; 2009; 2011; 2013; 2015; 2017; 2019; 2021; 2023; 2025; 2027; 2029

Timor-Leste participated at the 32nd Southeast Asian Games which was held from 5 to 16 May 2023 in Phnom Penh, Cambodia. Timor-Leste delegation to the 2023 Southeast Asian Games composed of 171 athletes, officials, and coaches, the second smallest contingent among all participant nations after Brunei.

== Medal summary ==
=== Medal by sport ===
Sport	1st place, gold medalist(s)	2nd place, silver medalist(s)	3rd place, bronze medalist(s)	Total
Athletics	0	0	0	0
Badminton	0	0	0	0
Basketball	0	0	0	0
Billiards	0	0	0	0
Boxing	0	0	2	2
Cricket	0	0	0	0
Cycling	0	0	0	0
Endurance race	0	0	0	0
Esports	0	0	0	0
Golf	0	0	0	0
Gymnastics	0	0	0	0
Hockey	0	0	0	0
Jujitsu	0	0	0	0
Karate	0	0	2	2
Ouk chaktrang	0	0	0	0
Pencak silat	0	0	0	0
Pétanque	0	0	0	0
Sailing	0	0	0	0
Sepaktakraw	0	0	0	0
Soft tennis	0	0	0	0
Swimming	0	0	0	0
Table tennis	0	0	0	0
Taekwondo	0	0	4	4
Tennis	0	0	0	0
Vovinam	0	0	0	0
Wushu	0	0	0	0
Total	0	0	8	8

=== Medal by gender ===
Medals by gender
Gender	1st place, gold medalist(s)	2nd place, silver medalist(s)	3rd place, bronze medalist(s)	Total	Percentage
Male	0	0	6	6	75.0%
Female	0	0	2	2	25.0%
Mixed	0	0	0	0	0%
Total	0	0	8	8	100%

=== Medal by date ===
Medals by date
Date	1st place, gold medalist(s)	2nd place, silver medalist(s)	3rd place, bronze medalist(s)	Total
4 May	0	0	0	0
5 May	Opening ceremony			
6 May	0	0	0	0
7 May	0	0	2	2
8 May	0	0	0	0
9 May	0	0	0	0
10 May	0	0	0	0
11 May	0	0	1	1
12 May	0	0	0	0
13 May	0	0	2	2
14 May	0	0	3	3
15 May	0	0	0	0
16 May	0	0	0	0
17 May	Closing ceremony			
Total	0	0	8	8

== Medalists ==
The following East Timorese competitors won medals at the Games.

No.	Medal	Name	Sport	Event	Date
1	Bronze	Deonisi Fernandes Pereira Queffi	Karate	Men's -67 kg kumite	May 7
2	Bronze	Jacob Manuel	Karate	Men's -75 kg kumite	May 7
3	Bronze	Ana Da Costa Da Silva Pinto Belo	Taekwondo	Women's under 46 kg	May 13
4	Bronze	Edegar Foe Quintas da Silva	Boxing	Men's -54 kg	May 13
5	Bronze	Delio Anzaqeci Mouzinho	Boxing	Men's -71 kg	May 13
6	Bronze	Cerilio Do Rugo Cruz Lein	Taekwondo	Men's under 58 kg	May 14
7	Bronze	Imbrolia De Araujo Dos Reis Amorin	Taekwondo	Women's under 62 kg	May 14
8	Bronze	Mousaco Galucho Claudio Joaquim	Taekwondo	Men's Over 87 kg	May 14
