= Myanmar at the 2023 SEA Games =

Myanmar at the 2023 Southeast Asian Games
- IOC code: MYA
- NOC: Myanmar Olympic Committee

in the Cambodia
- Competitors: 341 in 19 sports
- Flag bearer: Aung Khaing Lin
- Medals Ranked 8th: Gold 21 Silver 25 Bronze 68 Total 114

Southeast Asian Games appearances (overview)
- 1959; 1961; 1965; 1967; 1969; 1971; 1973; 1975; 1977; 1979; 1981; 1983; 1985; 1987; 1989; 1991; 1993; 1995; 1997; 1999; 2001; 2003; 2005; 2007; 2009; 2011; 2013; 2015; 2017; 2019; 2021; 2023; 2025; 2027; 2029

Myanmar participated at the 2023 Southeast Asian Games in Phnom Penh, Cambodia from 5 to 17 May 2023. Myanmar Olympic Committee sent 341 athletes to compete in 19 sports. Myanmar delegation included totally 500 with 341 athletes and 159 officials. The handing over of the victory flag for the Myanmar sports team by Prime Minister Min Aung Hlaing was held on April 25 at Wunnatheikdi Indoor Stadium (B). Starting from April 26, athletes left for Cambodia according to their respective sports.

Tun Myint Oo, the director general of Sports and Physical Education Department, led Myanmar Team. Min Thein Zan, Union Minister of Sports and Youth Affairs, closely encouraged the sports team starting on 4 May. The first gold medal for Myanmar was awarded from Vovinam.

== Medal summary ==
=== Medal by sport ===
Medals by sport
Sport	1st place, gold medalist(s)	2nd place, silver medalist(s)	3rd place, bronze medalist(s)	Total
Athletics	0	0	2	2
Badminton	0	1	0	1
Basketball	0	0	0	0
Billiards	2	0	2	4
Boxing	0	0	4	4
Cricket	0	0	1	1
Cycling	0	0	0	0
Endurance race	0	0	0	0
Esports	0	0	1	1
Golf	0	0	0	0
Gymnastics	0	0	0	0
Hockey	0	0	0	0
Judo	0	0	0	0
Jujitsu	0	0	0	0
Karate	0	0	0	0
Kun Bokator	1	2	6	9
Kun Khmer	0	2	7	9
Ouk chaktrang	0	0	2	2
Obstacle race	0	0	0	0
Pencak silat	0	0	0	0
Pétanque	1	0	0	1
Sailing	0	0	0	0
Sepaktakraw	6	4	1	11
Soft tennis	0	0	0	0
Swimming	0	0	0	0
Table tennis	0	0	0	0
Taekwondo	1	0	4	5
Traditional boat race	1	5	2	8
Tennis	0	0	0	0
Vovinam	4	3	17	24
Weightlifting	1	0	2	3
Wushu	1	3	3	7
Total	17	16	48	81

=== Medal by gender ===
Medals by gender
Gender	1st place, gold medalist(s)	2nd place, silver medalist(s)	3rd place, bronze medalist(s)	Total	Percentage
Male	8	4	28	40	49.4%
Female	7	9	18	34	42.0%
Mixed	2	3	2	7	8.6%
Total	18	20	54	92	100%
