= Cycling at the 2023 SEA Games – Men's cross country =

Cycling – Men's cross country at the 2023 SEA Games
- Venue: Siem Reap
- Dates: 6 May 2023
- Competitors: 20 from 8 nations

Medalists
gold medal	Feri Yudoyono	Indonesia
silver medal	Zaenal Fanani	Indonesia
bronze medal	Khim Menglong	Cambodia

The men's cross country mountain biking cycling event at the 2023 SEA Games took place on 6 May 2022, at Siem Reap, Cambodia. 20 riders from 8 nations competed in the event.

== Results ==
Rank	Rider	Time
1st place, gold medalist(s)	Feri Yudoyono (INA)	1:13:51
2nd place, silver medalist(s)	Zaenal Fanani (INA)	1:13:53
3rd place, bronze medalist(s)	Khim Menglong (CAM)	1:15:06
4	Ihza Muhammad (INA)	1:14:09 (Note: In accordance with the rules of the SEA Games Federation (SEAGF) article 37 paragraph C, which prohibits the same country from sweeping the medals in one event, Muhammad was relegated to fourth, since Indonesian riders finished first, second and third. The bronze medal was therefore awarded to the 4th place finisher, Khim Menglong.)
5	Zulfikri Zulkifli (MAS)	1:16:59
6	Pholachat Nakthongkam (THA)	1:18:02
7	Keerati Sukprasart (THA)	1:18:49
8	Jerico Cruz Rivera (PHI)	1:19:11
9	Chhan Chhayfong (CAM)	1:19:21
10	Muhammad Syawal Mazlin (MAS)	1:20:32
11	Riyadh Hakim bin Lukman (SGP)	1:20:56
12	Mark Louwel Antonio Valderama (PHI)	1:22:28
13	Van Lam Nguyen (VIE)	-1 LAP
14	Edmhel John Rivera Flores (PHI)	-1 LAP
15	Ahmad Syazrin Awang Ilah (MAS)	-1 LAP
16	Minh Dat Pham (VIE)	-2 LAP
17	Suphawit Somsin (THA)	-2 LAP
18	Joao Bosco Ximenes (TLS)	-3 LAP
19	Krouch Va (CAM)	-4 LAP
20	Van Nhat Bui (VIE)	DNF
