= Laos at the 2023 SEA Games =

Laos at the 2023 Southeast Asian Games
- IOC code: LAO
- NOC: National Olympic Committee of Lao
- Website: www.olympiclao.org.la (in Lao and English)

in Phnom Penh, Cambodia
- Competitors: 576
- Flag bearer: Soulasith Khamvongsa (Pétanque)
- Medals Ranked 9th: Gold 6 Silver 22 Bronze 60 Total 88

Southeast Asian Games appearances
- 1959; 1961; 1965; 1967; 1969; 1971; 1973; 1975–1987; 1989; 1991; 1993; 1995; 1997; 1999; 2001; 2003; 2005; 2007; 2009; 2011; 2013; 2015; 2017; 2019; 2021; 2023; 2025; 2027; 2029

Laos participated at the 32nd Southeast Asian Games which was held from 5 to 16 May 2023 in Phnom Penh, Cambodia. Laos delegation to the 2023 Southeast Asian Games composed of 576 athletes, as well as 80 officials and coaches, bringing the total member of the contingent to 656. Laotian athletes competed in 32 out of 46 events, eyeing 5 gold medals which they had already surpassed.

== Medal summary ==
=== Medal by Sport ===
Sport	1st place, gold medalist(s)	2nd place, silver medalist(s)	3rd place, bronze medalist(s)	Total
Athletics	0	0	0	0
Badminton	0	0	1	1
Basketball	0	0	0	0
Billiards	0	2	0	2
Boxing	0	0	3	3
Cricket	0	0	0	0
Cycling	0	0	0	0
Endurance race	0	0	0	0
Esports	0	0	1	1
Golf	0	0	0	0
Gymnastics	0	0	0	0
Hockey	0	0	0	0
Judo	0	1	1	2
Jujitsu	0	1	0	1
Karate	0	0	2	2
Kun Bokator	1	1	10	12
Kun Khmer	0	5	7	12
Ouk chaktrang	0	0	0	0
Obstacle race	0	0	1	1
Pencak silat	0	0	0	0
Pétanque	3	2	5	10
Sailing	0	0	0	0
Sepaktakraw	1	4	6	11
Soft tennis	0	0	3	3
Swimming	0	0	0	0
Table tennis	0	0	0	0
Taekwondo	0	1	1	2
Tennis	0	0	0	0
Vovinam	1	2	5	8
Weightlifting	0	0	1	1
Wrestling	0	1	1	2
Wushu	0	0	3	3
Total	6	20	51	77

=== Medal by gender ===
Medals by gender
Gender	1st place, gold medalist(s)	2nd place, silver medalist(s)	3rd place, bronze medalist(s)	Total	Percentage
Male	4	13	23	40	51.9%
Female	1	5	21	27	38.0%
Mixed	1	2	7	10	14%
Total	6	20	51	77	100%
