= Trust Golf Mixed Series =

Tournament information
- Location: Thailand
- Established: 2021
- Tours: Asian Tour; Taiwan PGA Tour; Ladies European Tour; WPGA Tour of Australasia; Taiwan LPGA Tour; TrustGolf Tour
- Format: Stroke play and Modified Stableford
- Prize fund: US$150,000

Tournament record score
- Aggregate: 259 Sadom Kaewkanjana (2021)
- To par: −29 as above
- Score: 71 points Suteepat Prateeptienchai (2023)

The Trust Golf Mixed Series is a golf competition held in Thailand. The inaugural two events of the Asian Mixed Series were played back-to-back on the Waterside Course at Siam Country Club, home of the Honda LPGA Thailand, between 7 and 16 April 2022.

== Asian Mixed Series ==
The 2022 series was held jointly on the Asian Tour and Ladies European Tour (LET), played in Pattaya, Thailand.

Both events featured 60 LET players and 60 Asian Tour players, along with 24 sponsor invitations, playing for the same prize fund and trophy. Each tournament offered a prize fund of US$750,000, along with Official World Golf Ranking points amongst the male field. Order of Merit points were awarded to players from both tours respectively.

The 2022 Trust Golf Asian Mixed Cup winner; Ratchanon Chantananuwat became the youngest male winner on a major tour, at 15 years and 37 days.

In 2025, it was announced that the Asian Mixed Series would return for three events, both being sanctioned by the Taiwan PGA Tour and the Taiwan LPGA Tour.

=== Winners ===
==== 2022 ====
Date	Tournament	Tours (Note: ASA − Asian Tour; LET − Ladies European Tour.)	Winner	Score	To par	Margin of victory	Runner-up	Ref.
10 Apr	Trust Golf Asian Mixed Cup	ASA, LET	(Thailand) Ratchanon Chantananuwat (a)	268	−20	2 strokes	(South Korea) Tom Kim	
16 Apr	Trust Golf Asian Mixed Stableford Challenge	ASA, LET	(United States) Sihwan Kim	49 points		2 points	(Sweden) Maja Stark	

==== 2025 ====
Date	Tournament	Tours (Note: TWN − Taiwan PGA Tour; TLPGA − Taiwan LPGA Tour.)	Winner	Score	To par	Margin of victory	Runner-up	Ref.
26 Jul	Trust Golf Asian Mixed 1	TWN, TLPGA	(Thailand) Thanyakon Khrongpha	201	−15	1 stroke	(Thailand) Sarut Vongchaisit	
17 Aug	Trust Golf Asian Mixed 2	TWN, TLPGA	(Thailand) Tawit Polthai	195	−18	2 strokes	(Taiwan) Wang Wei-hsuan	
22 Aug	Trust Golf Asian Mixed 3	TWN, TLPGA	(Thailand) Patcharajutar Kongkraphan	192	−21	2 strokes	(Thailand) Poom Saksansin	

== Thailand Mixed Series ==
The Thailand Mixed Series was inaugurated in 2021, created by the TrustGolf Tour. The series began with five events, all played in Thailand.

The 2022 series continued with another five events scheduled.

The 2023 series will be held jointly on the TrustGolf Tour and on the WPGA Tour of Australasia, played at St Andrews 2000 Golf Course, Rayong, and the Gassan Khuntan Golf & Resort. Each of the five events will have a field of 120 players, 60 male and 60 female, half from TrustGolf and half from the Australasian tours, split evenly between the WPGA Tour of Australasia and the PGA Tour of Australasia.

=== Winners ===
==== 2021 ====
Date	Tournament	Tour (Note: Trust − TrustGolf Tour.)	Winner	Score	To par	Margin of victory	Runner-up	Ref.
28 Feb	Thailand Mixed #1	Trust	(Thailand) Arpichaya Yubol	265	−23	1 stroke	(Thailand) Atthaya Thitikul	
17 Apr	Thailand Mixed #2	Trust	(Thailand) Prom Meesawat (Thailand) Chapchai Nirat	200 (Note: Shortened to 54 holes due to COVID-19 restrictions.)	−16	Title shared		
10 Oct	Thailand Mixed #3	Trust	(Thailand) Ramil Saelim (a)	275	−13	Playoff	(Thailand) Pannarai Meesom-us	
19 Nov	Thailand Mixed #4	Trust	(Thailand) Prom Meesawat	265	−23	4 strokes	(Thailand) Sadom Kaewkanjana	
31 Dec	Thailand Mixed #5	Trust	(Thailand) Sadom Kaewkanjana	259	−29	2 strokes	(Thailand) Wichayapat Sinsrang	

==== 2022 ====
Date	Tournament	Tour	Winner	Score	To par	Margin of victory	Runner(s)-up	Ref.
13 Feb	Thailand Mixed #1	Trust	(Thailand) Chanettee Wannasaen	270	−18	1 stroke	(Thailand) Pavarisa Yoktuan	
27 Mar	Thailand Mixed #2	Trust	(Thailand) Chanettee Wannasaen	266	−22	5 strokes	(Thailand) Prom Meesawat	
1 May	Thailand Mixed #3	Trust	(Thailand) Chanettee Wannasaen	269	−15	4 strokes	(Thailand) Sangchai Kaewcharoen	
28 Aug	Thailand Mixed #4	Trust	(Thailand) Atiruj Winaicharoenchai	38 points (Note: Tournament played in Modified Stableford format.)		5 points	(Thailand) Amarin Kraivixien	
18 Sep	Thailand Mixed #5	Trust	(Thailand) Arpichaya Yubol	265	−23	4 strokes	(Thailand) Ekpharit Wu (Thailand) Sirapob Yapala	

==== 2023 ====
Date	Tournament	Tours (Note: Trust − TrustGolf Tour; WANZ − WPGA Tour of Australasia.)	Winner	Score	To par	Margin of victory	Runner(s)-up	Ref.
14 May	Thailand Mixed Cup #1	Trust, WANZ	(Thailand) Denwit Boriboonsub	209 (Note: Shortened to 54 holes due to weather.)	−10	Playoff	(Thailand) Aunchisa Utama	
19 May	Thailand Mixed Stableford Challenge #1	Trust, WANZ	(Thailand) Jakraphan Premsirigorn	50 points		9 points	(Philippines) Justin Quiban	
18 Jun	Thailand Mixed Cup #2	Trust, WANZ	(Thailand) Charng-Tai Sudsom	261	−23	1 stroke	(Thailand) Suteepat Prateeptienchai (Thailand) Jakraphan Premsirigorn (Thailand) Ekpharit Wu	
24 Jun	Thailand Mixed Stableford Challenge #2	Trust, WANZ	(Thailand) Suteepat Prateeptienchai	71 points		3 points	(Thailand) Ekpharit Wu	
24 Sep	Thailand Mixed Final	Trust, WANZ	(Thailand) Newport Laparojkit	276	−18	1 stroke	(Thailand) Dechawat Phetprayoon	

== See also ==
- Scandinavian Mixed
- The Players Series
