= Eila Galitsky =

Thai amateur golfer (born 2006)

Personal information
- Full name: Eila Galitsky
- Nationality: Thailand
- Born: 26 October 2006 (age 20) Chiang Mai, Thailand

Career
- Sport: Golf
- College: University of South Carolina
- Status: Amateur
- Professional wins: 2

Best results in LPGA major championships
- Chevron Championship: T28: 2023
- Women's PGA C'ship: DNP
- U.S. Women's Open: DNP
- Women's British Open: CUT: 2023
- Evian Championship: CUT: 2023
Medal record
Asian Games
Gold medal – first place	2022 Hangzhou	Team
SEA Games
Gold medal – first place	2021 Hanoi	Team
Gold medal – first place	2023 Phnom Penh	Team
Silver medal – second place	2023 Phnom Penh	Individual

Eila Galitsky (Thai: แอลล่า แกลิทสกีย์; born 26 October 2006) is a Thai amateur golfer. She won the 2023 Women's Amateur Asia-Pacific Championship, which earned her invitations to several major championships, including the 2023 Chevron Championship, where she made the cut and finished as the low amateur in a tie for 28th place.

Galitsky is currently studying at the University of South Carolina, competing as part of the South Carolina Gamecocks women's golf team.

== Early life and background ==
Galitsky was born in Chiang Mai, Thailand to a Thai mother and Canadian father. She began playing golf at a young age and quickly rose through the junior ranks.

== Amateur career ==
In March 2023, Galitsky won the Women's Amateur Asia-Pacific in Singapore by a five-stroke margin. The victory earned her exemptions into several major LPGA tournaments, including the Chevron Championship, Women's British Open, and Evian Championship.

At the 2023 Chevron Championship, then 16 years old, Galitsky briefly held the lead during the first round and eventually earned low amateur honors with a tie for 28th-place finish. Later that year, she represented Thailand at the 2023 SEA Games in Cambodia where she helped the team win the gold medal in the women's team event and secured an individual silver medal.

Galitsky was also part of the Thai national team at the 2022 Asian Games, held in 2023 due to the COVID-19 pandemic. The team won the gold medal in the women's golf team event.

In 2024, she enrolled at the University of South Carolina and joined the South Carolina Gamecocks women's golf team.

In 2025, Galitsky represented the Asia-Pacific team at the Patsy Hankins Trophy, where she notably defeated then-World No.1 amateur Lottie Woad in their singles match, contributing to Asia-Pacific's overall victory over the European team.

Galitsky is currently ranked among the top amateur golfers in the world by the World Amateur Golf Ranking.

== Personal life ==
Galitsky is the daughter of Gary and Wasana Galitsky and has a younger brother, Benjamin. At South Carolina, she is majoring in Sport & Entertainment Management.

== Amateur wins ==
- 2021 Thailand Junior Development Tour #2 Northern Region, U.S. Junior Championship #2, U.S. Junior Championship #5
- 2022 National Team Ranking #5
- 2023 National Team Ranking #3, Women's Amateur Asia-Pacific Championship, Macedonian Amateur Open
- 2025 Moon Golf Invitational, Annika Intercollegiate

== Professional wins (2) ==
=== Thai LPGA Tour wins (2) ===
- 2024 (1) Singha-NSDF Muan Suen^
- 2025 (1) Singha-SAT Thai LPGA Ladies Open^

^ Galitsky won the event as an amateur.

== Results in LPGA majors ==
Tournament	2023
Chevron Championship	T28LA
U.S. Women's Open	
Women's PGA Championship	
The Evian Championship	CUT
Women's British Open	CUT

Did not play

LA = low amateur
CUT = missed the half-way cut
"T" = tied

== Team appearances ==
Amateur

- Arnold Palmer Cup (representing International): 2025 (winners)
- Patsy Hankins Trophy (representing Asia/Pacific): 2025 (winners)
- Asian Games (representing Thailand): 2022 (winners)
- SEA Games (representing Thailand): 2023 (winners)
- Espirito Santo Trophy (representing Thailand): 2022, 2023
