= Taekwondo at the 2023 SEA Games =

- Venue: Chroy Changvar Convention Centre
- Location: Phnom Penh, Cambodia
- Dates: 12–15 May 2023

Taekwondo competitions at the 2023 SEA Games took place at Chroy Changvar Convention Centre Phnom Penh, Cambodia from 12 to 15 May 2023. Medals were awarded in 24 events in two categories, poomsae and kyorugi.

== Medal table ==
* Host nation (Cambodia)

Rank	Nation	Gold	Silver	Bronze	Total
1	Thailand	7	6	2	15
2	Philippines	6	1	8	15
3	Vietnam	4	5	3	12
4	Malaysia	3	2	3	8
5	Cambodia*	2	4	10	16
6	Indonesia	1	4	4	9
7	Myanmar	1	0	4	5
8	Singapore	0	1	4	5
9	Laos	0	1	2	3
10	Timor-Leste	0	0	4	4
Totals (10 entries)		24	24	44	92

== Medalists ==
=== Recognized poomsae ===
Event	Gold	Silver	Bronze
Men's individual	Patrick Perez; Philippines	Chin Ken Haw; Malaysia	Chhorn Kimhak; Cambodia
Men's individual	Patrick Perez; Philippines	Chin Ken Haw; Malaysia	Kaung Zhin Khant; Myanmar
Women's individual	Nur Humaira Abdul Karim; Malaysia	Diyanah Aqidah Dian Khudairi; Singapore	Mang Kanithyda; Cambodia
Women's individual	Nur Humaira Abdul Karim; Malaysia	Diyanah Aqidah Dian Khudairi; Singapore	Yotthida Khenphokham; Laos
Men's team	Vietnam; Phạm Quốc Việt; Nguyễn Thiên Phụng; Nguyễn Trọng Phúc	Philippines; Ian Corton; Joaquin Tuzon; Patrick Perez	Thailand; Nattachai Sutha; Sippakorn Wetchakornpatiwong; Worapol Sianglio
Men's team	Vietnam; Phạm Quốc Việt; Nguyễn Thiên Phụng; Nguyễn Trọng Phúc	Philippines; Ian Corton; Joaquin Tuzon; Patrick Perez	Singapore; Aloysius Yeo Zhijie; Khaw Hoong Keat; Ranen Fong Peng Shin
Women's team	Philippines; Jocel Lyn Ninobla; Nicole Labayne; Aidaine Laxa	Malaysia; Lim Jia Wei; Nur Humaira Abdul Karim; Nurul Hidayah Abdul Karim	Thailand; Ornawee Srisahakit; Pichamon Limpaiboon; Ratchadawan Tapaenthong
Women's team	Philippines; Jocel Lyn Ninobla; Nicole Labayne; Aidaine Laxa	Malaysia; Lim Jia Wei; Nur Humaira Abdul Karim; Nurul Hidayah Abdul Karim	Vietnam; Nguyễn Thị Kim Hà; Lê Trần Kim Uyên; Nguyễn Thị Hồng Trang
Mixed pair	Malaysia; Jason Loo Jun Wei; Nurul Hidayah Abdul Karim	Vietnam; Lê Trần Kim Uyên; Phạm Quốc Việt	Philippines; Ian Corton; Jocel Lyn Ninobla
Mixed pair	Malaysia; Jason Loo Jun Wei; Nurul Hidayah Abdul Karim	Vietnam; Lê Trần Kim Uyên; Phạm Quốc Việt	Singapore; Diyanah Aqidah Dian Khudairi; Ranen Fong Peng Shin

=== Freestyle poomsae ===
Event	Gold	Silver	Bronze
Men's individual	Jiraphong Khetlak; Thailand	Wawan Saputra; Indonesia	Keo Moni; Cambodia
Women's individual	Sasipha Chuphon; Thailand	Voeun Shita; Cambodia	Nine Akri Soe; Myanmar
Mixed team	Vietnam; Châu Tuyết Vân; Hứa Văn Huy; Nguyễn Ngọc Minh Hy; Nguyễn Thị Mộng Quỳnh; Trần Đăng Khoa	Thailand; Sasipha Chuphon; Nuttapat Kaewkan; Jiraphong Khetlak; Thunsinee Mookda; Chutiphon Pansoon	Philippines; Juvenile Crisostomo; Jeordan Dominguez; Justin Macario; Zyka Santiago; Darius Venerable
Mixed team	Vietnam; Châu Tuyết Vân; Hứa Văn Huy; Nguyễn Ngọc Minh Hy; Nguyễn Thị Mộng Quỳnh; Trần Đăng Khoa	Thailand; Sasipha Chuphon; Nuttapat Kaewkan; Jiraphong Khetlak; Thunsinee Mookda; Chutiphon Pansoon	Cambodia; Chhoeung Lyna; Chon Sovan; Kang Langchhun; Keo Moni; Nang Vannak

=== Men's kyorugi ===
Event	Gold	Silver	Bronze
Finweight; 54 kg	Kurt Bryan Barbosa; Philippines	Ramnarong Sawekwiharee; Thailand	Sebastian Tan Chung Wan; Malaysia
Finweight; 54 kg	Kurt Bryan Barbosa; Philippines	Ramnarong Sawekwiharee; Thailand	Keston Ghim Weng Pang; Singapore
Flyweight; 58 kg	Thanakrit Yodrak; Thailand	Sam Youdeth; Cambodia	Cerilio do Rego Cruz Lein; Timor-Leste
Flyweight; 58 kg	Thanakrit Yodrak; Thailand	Sam Youdeth; Cambodia	Fu Cern Put Thai; Malaysia
Bantamweight; 63 kg	Phạm Đăng Quang; Vietnam	Napat Sritimongkol; Thailand	Muhammad Bassam Raihan; Indonesia
Bantamweight; 63 kg	Phạm Đăng Quang; Vietnam	Napat Sritimongkol; Thailand	Joseph Tumaca Chua; Philippines
Featherweight; 68 kg	Arven Alcantara; Philippines	Chaichon Cho; Thailand	Adam Yazid Ferdyansyah; Indonesia
Featherweight; 68 kg	Arven Alcantara; Philippines	Chaichon Cho; Thailand	Mean Soursayik; Cambodia
Lightweight; 74 kg	Lý Hồng Phúc; Vietnam	Jack Woody Mercer; Thailand	Va Mithona; Cambodia
Lightweight; 74 kg	Lý Hồng Phúc; Vietnam	Jack Woody Mercer; Thailand	Myint Ko Ko; Myanmar
Welterweight; 80 kg	Muhammad Syafiq Zuber; Malaysia	Naufal Khairudin Osanando; Indonesia	Somsanouk Phommavanh; Laos
Welterweight; 80 kg	Muhammad Syafiq Zuber; Malaysia	Naufal Khairudin Osanando; Indonesia	Dave Cuenca Cea; Philippines
Middleweight; 87 kg	Samuel Morrison; Philippines	Nicholas Armanto; Indonesia	Muhd Luqman Hakim Suhaimi; Malaysia
Middleweight; 87 kg	Samuel Morrison; Philippines	Nicholas Armanto; Indonesia	Phou Soucheng; Cambodia
Heavyweight +87 kg	Kyaw Ming Naing; Myanmar	Vann Rithy; Cambodia	Claudio Mousaco; Timor-Leste

=== Women's kyorugi ===
Event	Gold	Silver	Bronze
Finweight; 46 kg	Julanan Khantikulanon; Thailand	Ni Kadek Heni Prikasih; Indonesia	Veronica Garces; Philippines
Finweight; 46 kg	Julanan Khantikulanon; Thailand	Ni Kadek Heni Prikasih; Indonesia	Ana da Costa da Silva; Timor-Leste
Flyweight; 49 kg	Panipak Wongpattanakit; Thailand	Trương Thị Kim Tuyền; Vietnam	Lyden Kry; Cambodia
Flyweight; 49 kg	Panipak Wongpattanakit; Thailand	Trương Thị Kim Tuyền; Vietnam	Nur Fadzlyn Zahruddin; Singapore
Bantamweight; 53 kg	Megawati Tamesti Maheswari; Indonesia	Chutikan Jongkolrattanawattana; Thailand	Baby Jessica Canabal; Philippines
Bantamweight; 53 kg	Megawati Tamesti Maheswari; Indonesia	Chutikan Jongkolrattanawattana; Thailand	Julie Mam; Cambodia
Featherweight; 57 kg	Phannapa Harnsujin; Thailand	Aliza Chhoeung; Cambodia	Nicole McCann; Philippines
Featherweight; 57 kg	Phannapa Harnsujin; Thailand	Aliza Chhoeung; Cambodia	Vũ Thị Dung; Vietnam
Lightweight; 62 kg	Sasikarn Tongchan; Thailand	Trần Thị Ánh Tuyết; Vietnam	Sok Sreytoch; Cambodia
Lightweight; 62 kg	Sasikarn Tongchan; Thailand	Trần Thị Ánh Tuyết; Vietnam	Imbrolia Amorin; Timor-Leste
Welterweight; 67 kg	Casandre Tubbs; Cambodia	Bạc Thị Khiêm; Vietnam	Laila Rimbawa Delo; Philippines
Welterweight; 67 kg	Casandre Tubbs; Cambodia	Bạc Thị Khiêm; Vietnam	Silvana Lamanda; Indonesia
Middleweight; 73 kg	Kirstie Alora; Philippines	Nguyễn Thị Hương; Vietnam	Dinda Putri Lestari; Indonesia
Middleweight; 73 kg	Kirstie Alora; Philippines	Nguyễn Thị Hương; Vietnam	Cheang Bunna; Cambodia
Heavyweight +73 kg	Sorn Seavmey; Cambodia	Sirimanotham Sonesavanh; Laos	Moe Pwint Phyu; Myanmar
