= Finswimming at the 2023 SEA Games =

Competitions held at Phnom Penh, Cambodia

- Venue: Morodok Techo Sports Complex
- Location: Phnom Penh, Cambodia
- Dates: 12–14 May 2023

Finswimming competitions at the 2023 SEA Games took place at Morodok Techo Sports Complex in Phnom Penh, Cambodia from 12 to 14 May 2023.

== Medal table ==
* Host nation (Cambodia)

Rank	Nation	Gold	Silver	Bronze	Total
1	Vietnam	14	11	4	29
2	Indonesia	6	10	5	21
3	Thailand	2	1	10	13
4	Cambodia*	2	1	4	7
5	Philippines	0	1	0	1
6	Malaysia	0	0	1	1
Totals (6 entries)		24	24	24	72

== Medalists ==
=== Men ===
Event	Gold	Silver	Bronze
50 m bi-fins	Wuthiphat Sa-nguanwong; Thailand	Harvey Hubert Hutasuhut; Indonesia	Chris Chew Vi Min; Malaysia
100 m bi-fins	Harvey Hubert Hutasuhut; Indonesia	Vũ Đặng Nhật Nam; Vietnam	Geargchai Rutnosot; Thailand
200 m bi-fins	Vũ Đặng Nhật Nam; Vietnam	Nguyễn Lê Truyền Đạt; Vietnam	Surabordee Sangkaew; Thailand
400 m bi-fins	Vũ Đặng Nhật Nam; Vietnam	Nguyễn Lê Truyền Đạt; Vietnam	Kaiser Hansel Putra Franciscus; Indonesia
50 m surface	Wahyu Anggoro Tamtomo; Indonesia	Nguyễn Thành Lộc; Vietnam	Khet Chamnanwat; Thailand
100 m surface	Nguyễn Thành Lộc; Vietnam	Đỗ Đình Toàn; Vietnam	Khet Chamnanwat; Thailand
200 m surface	Wuthiphat Sa-nguanwong; Thailand	Lim Sokwadthanon; Cambodia	Toun Tithsatya; Cambodia
400 m surface	Kim Anh Kiệt; Vietnam	Nguyễn Trọng Dũng; Vietnam	Muhammad Amirullah Al Farizi; Indonesia
800 m surface	Nguyễn Trọng Dũng; Vietnam	Paphonpach Wongaek; Thailand	Natthaphol Tanprawat; Thailand
4 × 100 m surface	Vietnam; Đặng Đức Mạnh; Đỗ Đình Toàn; Nguyễn Thành Lộc; Nguyễn Tiến Đạt	Indonesia; Bima Dea Sakti Antono; Dio Novandra Wibawa; Muhammad Amirullah Al Farizi; Petrol Apostle Kambey	Thailand; Katamat Autapao; Khet Chamnanwat; Papnonpach Wongaek; Wuthiphat Sa-Nguanwong
4 × 200 m surface	Vietnam; Đặng Đức Mạnh; Đỗ Đình Toàn; Nguyễn Khang Dũng; Nguyễn Trọng Dũng	Indonesia; Bima Dea Sakti Antono; Dio Novandra Wibawa; Muhammad Amirullah Al Farizi; Petrol Apostle Kambey	Cambodia; Chhom Chanthon; Lim Keouodom; Lim Sokwadthanoon; Toun Tithsatya

=== Women ===
Event	Gold	Silver	Bronze
50 m bi-fins	Nguyễn Thị Thảo; Vietnam	Lê Thị Thanh Vân; Vietnam	Ressa Kania Dewi; Indonesia
100 m bi-fins	Lê Thị Thanh Vân; Vietnam	Ressa Kania Dewi; Indonesia	Nguyễn Thị Thảo; Vietnam
200 m bi-fins	Kaing Muynin; Cambodia	Alexi Cabayaran; Philippines	Kheun Bunpichmorakat; Cambodia
400 m bi-fins	Kaing Muynin; Cambodia	Raqiel Azzahra; Indonesia	Kheun Bunpichmorakat; Cambodia
50 m surface	Janis Rosalita Suprianto; Indonesia	Cao Thị Duyên; Vietnam	Phạm Thị Thu; Vietnam
100 m surface	Janis Rosalita Suprianto; Indonesia	Cao Thị Duyên; Vietnam	Phạm Thị Thu; Vietnam
200 m surface	Janis Rosalita Suprianto; Indonesia	Đặng Thị Vương; Vietnam	Katherina Eda Rahayu; Indonesia
400 m surface	Nguyễn Trần San San; Vietnam	Oza Peby Mulyani; Indonesia	Phạm Thị Hồng Điệp; Vietnam
800 m surface	Nguyễn Trần San San; Vietnam	Oza Peby Mulyani; Indonesia	Andhini Muthia Maulida; Indonesia
4 × 100 m surface	Vietnam; Cao Thị Duyên; Đặng Thị Vương; Trần Phương Nhi; Phạm Thị Thu	Indonesia; Andhini Muthia Maulida; Janis Rosalita Suprianto; Katherina Eda Rahayu; Vania Elvira Elent Rahmadani	Thailand; Nusanee Chandaeng; Warunee Intaraprasat; Juthamas Sutthison; Nuchwara Vichaksanapong
4 × 200 m surface	Vietnam; Cao Thị Duyên; Đặng Thị Vương; Nguyễn Hoài Thương; Phạm Thị Thu	Indonesia; Andhini Muthia Maulida; Janis Rosalita Suprianto; Katherina Eda Rahayu; Vania Elvira Elent Rahmadani	Thailand; Nusanee Chandaeng; Warunee Intaraprasat; Juthamas Sutthison; Nuchwara Vichaksanapong

=== Mixed ===
Event	Gold	Silver	Bronze
4 × 100 m bi-fins	Indonesia; Harvey Hubert Hutasuhut; Josephine Christabel Suryanto; Kaisar Hansel Putra Franciscus; Ressa Kania Dewi	Vietnam; Lê Thị Thanh Vân; Nguyễn Thị Thảo; Vũ Đặng Nhật Nam; Vũ Văn Bắc	Thailand; Nusanee Chandaeng; Phanuphong Jarassri; Geargchai Rutnosot; Juthamas Sutthison
4 × 50 m surface	Vietnam; Cao Thị Duyên; Đỗ Đình Toàn; Nguyễn Thành Lộc; Phạm Thị Thu	Indonesia; Janis Rosalita Suprianto; Petrol Apostle Kambey; Vania Elvira Elent Rahmadani; Wahyu Anggoro Tamtomo	Thailand; Katamat Autapao; Khet Chamnanwat; Warunee Intaraprasat; Nuchwara Vichaksanapong
