= Jocel Lyn Ninobla =

Filipino athlete (born 1996)

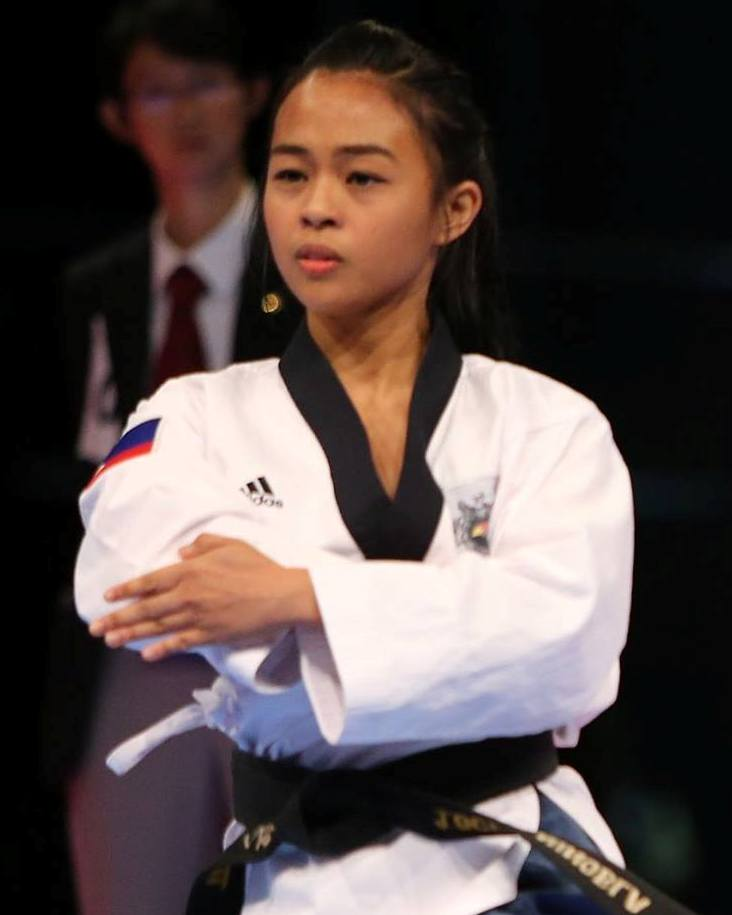
- Ninobla in 2017

Personal information
- Born: 20 June 1996 (age 30)

Sport
- Country: Philippines
- Sport: Taekwondo
- Event(s): Recognized Poomsae; Freestyle Poomsae

Achievements and titles
- Highest world ranking: 2 (2022-2023)
Medal record
Women's Taekwondo
Representing Philippines
Event	1st	2nd	3rd
World Championships	2	1	2
South East Asian Games	3	1	3
Asian Championships	2	0	5
Total	7	2	10
Senior
World Championships
Silver medal – second place	Aguascalientes 2014	Freestyle, Pair over 17
Bronze medal – third place	Taipei 2018	Poomsae, f under 30
Bronze medal – third place	2020 Online	Poomsae, f under 30
World Beach Championships
Gold medal – first place	Chuncheon 2023	Poomsae, f under 30
Asian Championships
Silver medal – second place	2014 Tashkent	Freestyle, f over 17
Silver medal – second place	2016 Pasay	Poomsae, Team f under 30
Bronze medal – third place	2016 Pasay	Poomsae, f under 30
Bronze medal – third place	2021 Beirut	Poomsae, f under 30
Bronze medal – third place	2021 Beirut	Poomsae, Team f under 30
Bronze medal – third place	2022 Chuncheon	Poomsae, Pair under 30
Bronze medal – third place	2026 Ulaanbaatar	Poomsae, f under 30
SEA Games
Gold medal – first place	2019 Manila	Poomsae, f senior
Gold medal – first place	2021 Hanoi	Poomsae, f senior
Gold medal – first place	2023 Phnom Penh	Poomsae, Team Female
Silver medal – second place	2019 Manila	Poomsae, Team Female
Bronze medal – third place	2017 Kuala Lumpur	Poomsae, Team Female
Bronze medal – third place	2023 Phnom Penh	Poomsae, Pair Senior
Bronze medal – third place	2025 Bangkok–Chonburi	Poomsae, Pair Senior
Junior
World Championships
Gold medal – first place	Bali 2013	Poomsae, Team f under 17

Jocel Lyn Ninobla (born 20 June 1996) is a Filipina taekwondo athlete and three-time SEA Games champion.

== Career history ==
Jocel Lyn Ninobla won her first major medal on the international stage in Bali in 2013, where she became world champion in the women's Junior Recognized Poomsae team competition. She won her first individual senior medal at the 2014 Asian Championships in Tashkent by placing second in the women's Freestyle Poomsae competition.

At the 2014 World Poomsae championships, Ninobla became the silver medalist in the pair's Recognized Poomsae competition. She is also a two-time world bronze medalist in the women's Recognized Poomsae competition: In 2018, she placed fourth behind Taiwanese athlete Ying-Hsian Lee, claiming one of the bronze medals of the single-elimination tournament. In 2020, she took third place before Denmark's Eva Sandersen with 7.280/4.15 to 7.210/4.12 points.

Ninobla is a three-time SEA Games champion, having won the women's Recognized Poomsae competition in 2019 and 2021 as well as the women's team competition in 2023.

She participated in the Goyang 2022 World Taekwondo Poomsae Championships. The following year, she placed first in the women's under 30 Recognized Poomsae competition at the 2023 World Taekwondo Beach Championship in Chuncheon.

== Personal life ==
Ninobla holds a sports science degree from the University of Santo Tomas.
