= Thailand at the 2023 SEA Games =

- IOC code: THA
- NOC: National Olympic Committee of Thailand
- Website: www.olympicthai.org (in Thai and English)

in Phnom Penh, Cambodia
- Competitors: 877 in 38 sports
- Flag bearer: Chanatip Jakrawan (Basketball)
- Medals Ranked 2nd: Gold 108 Silver 96 Bronze 108 Total 312

SEA Games appearances (overview)
- 1961; 1965; 1967; 1969; 1971; 1973; 1975; 1977; 1979; 1981; 1983; 1985; 1987; 1989; 1991; 1993; 1995; 1997; 1999; 2001; 2003; 2005; 2007; 2009; 2011; 2013; 2015; 2017; 2019; 2021; 2023; 2025; 2027; 2029

Thailand competed at the 32nd SEA Games which was held from 5 to 17 May 2023 in Phnom Penh, Cambodia. Thailand delegation to the 2023 SEA Games composed of 877 athletes in 38 sports.

== Medal summary ==
=== Medal by sport ===
Sport	1st place, gold medalist(s)	2nd place, silver medalist(s)	3rd place, bronze medalist(s)	Total
Athletics	16	8	5	29
Boxing	9	2	1	12
Taekwondo	7	6	2	15
Sepaktakraw	7	3	1	11
Jujitsu	6	2	5	13
Pétanque	6	0	5	11
Vovinam	5	3	8	16
Traditional Boat Race	5	3	0	8
Swimming	4	11	7	22
Jet ski	4	5	1	10
Sailing	4	2	1	7
Ouk chaktrang	4	0	1	5
Cricket	3	0	1	4
Weightlifting	2	7	1	10
Pencak silat	2	3	5	10
Tennis	2	3	4	9
Badminton	2	2	3	7
Cycling	2	2	2	6
Finswimming	2	1	10	13
Karate	2	1	5	8
Golf	2	1	0	3
Volleyball	2	1	0	3
Billiards	1	1	6	8
Floorball	1	1	0	2
Indoor Hockey	1	0	1	2
Table tennis	1	0	1	2
Wushu	1	1	2	4
Fencing	1	1	0	2
Judo	1	0	0	1
Gymnastics	0	5	0	5
Soft tennis	0	2	4	6
Dancesport	0	1	1	2
Football	0	1	1	2
Field Hockey	0	1	1	2
Endurance race	0	1	0	1
Esports	0	0	2	2
Basketball	0	0	2	2
Total	108	96	108	312

=== Medal by date ===
Medals by date
Date	1st place, gold medalist(s)	2nd place, silver medalist(s)	3rd place, bronze medalist(s)	Total
4 May	1	1	1	3
5 May	Opening ceremony			
6 May	6	9	15	30
7 May	9	7	10	26
8 May	12	5	7	24
9 May	12	6	12	30
10 May	7	8	6	21
11 May	7	3	6	16
12 May	6	4	12	22
13 May	18	10	9	37
14 May	13	15	10	38
15 May	3	8	5	16
16 May	14	20	10	44
17 May	Closing ceremony			
Total	108	96	108	312

== Medalists ==
The following Thailand competitors won medals at the Games.

=== Gold ===
No.	Medal	Name	Sport	Event	Date
1	Gold	Kunsatri Kumsroi; Suphawadee Kaeosrasaen	Jujitsu	Women's Show	May 4
2	Gold	Wisuwat Teerapabpaisit; Ekkalak Ngammeesri; Tinnakrit Arunnuntapanich; Boonsueb Saeheng	Chess / Ouk chaktrang	Men's Quadruples 60-Minute	May 6
3	Gold	Warot Kananub; Worathep Timsri	Chess / Ouk chaktrang	Men's triples 60-Minute	May 6
4	Gold	Jenjira Srisaard	Swimming	Women's 50 m breaststroke	May 6
5	Gold	Panyaporn Phaophan; Kanyarat Phaophan	Jujitsu	Women's Duo	May 6
6	Gold	Warut Netpong; Charatchai Kitpongsri	Jujitsu	Men's Show	May 6
7	Gold	Suwijak Kuntong	Jujitsu	Men's Ne-waza gi 62 kg	May 6
8	Gold	Ratcharat Yimprai; Arreewan Chansri	Jujitsu	Mixed Show	May 7
9	Gold	Teerawat Kangtong	Karate	Men's kumite +84 kg	May 7
10	Gold	Kewalin Songklin	Karate	Women's kumite +68 kg	May 7
11	Gold	Orawan Choosuwan; Saowanee Chanthamunee	Pencak silat	Women's double Artistic Ganda	May 7
12	Gold	Sirion Sarachip	Pétanque	Women's Single	May 7
13	Gold	Sutida Nakcharoensri	Vovinam	Women's Cross Form	May 7
14	Gold	Komin Naonon; Eekkawee Ruenpharn; Kamol Prasert; Thongchai Sombatkert; Khanawut Rungrot; Kittichai Khamsaenrach; Apisit Chaichana; Noppadon Kongthwthong	Sepak takraw	Men's Chinlone Same stroke	May 7
15	Gold	Losantia Kittiya; Duangwao Wilawan; Todkaew Jiratchaya; Bureewan Benjamas; Sakulpithak Tikhamporn; Jomjan Priyakorn; Phakdeengam Phimphakan; Tongkham Thanaporn; Pathumpairot Chatchanan; Metta Phimmada; Ogbuneke Papichaya; Suttiprapa Somlak	Hockey	Women's indoor tournament	May 7
16	Gold	Lalita Yuennan; Warawut Saengsriruang	Jujitsu	Mixed Duo	May 7
17	Gold	Kieran Tuntivate	Athletics	Men's 1,500 m	May 8
18	Gold	Soraoat Dabbang	Athletics	Men's 200 m	May 8
19	Gold	Kittipong Boonmawan	Athletics	Men's hammer throw	May 8
20	Gold	Parinya Chuaimaroeng	Athletics	Women's triple jump	May 8
21	Gold	Ek Boonsawad	Sailing	Men's Wind Foil IQ:Foil	May 8
22	Gold	Passapong Lianglam	Sailing	Men's Wind Foil IQ:Foil Youth	May 8
23	Gold	Thorfun Boonnak	Sailing	Women's ILCA 6	May 8
24	Gold	Chanatip TongglumPatcharaphan Ongkaloy	Sailing	Mixed Optimist Mix	May 8
25	Gold	Methasit Boonsane	Cycling	Men's Mountain Bike Eliminate	May 8
26	Gold	Gatesinee Poyim; Jiraporn Palasri; Kanyarat Plabwangklam; Pimpika Moongsupeng; Pornpairin Paenthong; Sujittra Nawasimma; Suwanna Petsamorn; Yowvalux Jaisue	Sepak takraw	Women's Chinlone (Linking)	May 8
27	Gold	Wichian Sripaengpong	Vovinam	Men's 55 kg	May 8
28	Gold	Dahalan Pohdingsamu; Phupakorn Wongthanachet	Vovinam	Men's pair knife form	May 8
29	Gold	Kamonchanok Kwanmuang	Swimming	Women's 400 m Individual	May 9
30	Gold	Thanlada Thongchomphunut	Athletics	Women's high jump	May 9
31	Gold	Kieran Tuntivate	Athletics	Men's 5,000 m	May 9
32	Gold	Sutthisak Singkhon	Athletics	Men's Decathlon	May 9
33	Gold	Jakkapat Noisri	Athletics	Men's shot put	May 9
34	Gold	Boonsueb Saeheng	Chess / Ouk chaktrang	Men's singles 60-Minute	May 9
35	Gold	Warot Kananub; Worathep Timsri	Chess / Ouk chaktrang	Men's doubles 60-Minute	May 9
36	Gold	Aekkarin Kaewla; Ratchata Khamdee	Pétanque	Men's doubles	May 9
37	Gold	Sarawut Sriboonpeng; Nantawan Fuengsanit	Pétanque	Men's Mixed doubles	May 9
38	Gold	Yuttana Charoenphon; Pruchya Isaro; Kasidit Samrej; Thantub Suksumrarn	Tennis	Men's team	May 9
39	Gold	Anupak Phetpoon	Vovinam	Men's 70 kg	May 9
40	Gold	Rattanaphon Hanphan	Vovinam	Women's 50 kg	May 9
41	Gold	Phiraphon Mitthasan	Pencak silat	Men's tanding class C (55–60kg)	May 10
42	Gold	Subenrat Insaeng	Athletics	Women's Discus throw	May 10
43	Gold	Nattaphon Dansungnoen	Athletics	Men's 110 m hurdles	May 10
44	Gold	Jirapat Khanonta; Sukanda Petraksa; Athicha Phetkun; Manatsada Sanmano	Athletics	Women's 4 × 100 m relay	May 10
45	Gold	Chonthicha Khabut	Athletics	Women's Pole vault	May 10
46	Gold	Sujinda Yangrungrawin; Pitaya Yangrungrawin; Wanchai Yodyinghathaikun	Wushu	Wushu Men's Dulian	May 10
47	Gold	Tonnam Kanteemool	Swimming	Men's 200 m backstroke	May 10
48	Gold	Benyapa Aimsaard; Nuntakarn Aimsaard; Lalinrat Chaiwan; Laksika Kanlaha; Supanida Katethong; Jongkolphan Kititharakul; Chasinee Korepap; Phataimas Muenwong; Pitchamon Opatniputh; Rawinda Prajongjai	Badminton	Women's team	May 11
49	Gold	Orawan Paranang; Jinnipa Sawettabut; Suthasini Sawettabut	Table tennis	Women's team	May 11
50	Gold	Jutatip Maneephan	Cycling	Women's criterium	May 11
51	Gold	Anupong Khamfu; Sudarat Tasorn; Nattaya Yoothong	Pétanque	Mixed triples (2 women and 1 man)	May 11
52	Gold	Areerat Intadis	Athletics	Women's shot put	May 11
53	Gold	Jenjira Srisaard	Swimming	Women's 50 m butterfly	May 11
54	Gold	Kritsanut Lertsattayathorn; Wattana Pu-Ob-Orm	Billiards	Men's Snooker 6-red Doubles	May 11
55	Gold	Tawan Kaeodam	Athletics	Men's High jump	May 12
56	Gold	Soraoat Dabbang	Athletics	Men's 100 m	May 12
57	Gold	Jariya Wichaidit	Athletics	Women's Jevelin Throw	May 12
58	Gold	Voragun Srinualnad	Fencing	Men's individual sabre	May 12
59	Gold	Jiraphong Khetlak	Taekwondo	Men's freestyle individual	May 12
60	Gold	Sasipha Chuphon	Taekwondo	Women's freestyle individual	May 12
61	Gold	Jiradech Chaowarat; Arsit Areephun; Ratchanon Chantananuwat	Golf	Men's team	May 13
62	Gold	Navaporn Soontreeyapas; Eila Galitsky	Golf	Women's team	May 13
63	Gold	Lalita Chiaochan; Kantaros Choochuay; Panadda Jandung; Aumpawan Suwannaphruk	Pétanque	Women's triples	May 13
64	Gold	Chareonwit Ketsattaban; Anuphon Phathan; Thawonsith Ratchakot; Thanakorn Sangkaew	Pétanque	Men's triples	May 13
65	Gold	Sukon Boon-em; Kasemsit Borriboonwasin; Suradet Faengnoi; Panlop Jeenchai; Nattapon Kaewsri; Natthapon Kreepkamrai; Pornprom Kramsuk; Suwan Kwanthong; Watchara Muangkum; Phatthara Sangdet; Somchai Sangmuang; Chitsanupong Sangpan; Nopphadol Sangthuang; Phakdee Wannamane	Traditional boat race	Men's 12 crews (open) 250 m	May 13
66	Gold	Teerasak Chuden; Jirawan Hankhamla; Watcharaporn Khaditya; Photsawat Nachaikhong; Sayawadee Ngaosri; Anuthida Saeheng; Thitima Sukrat; Anchalee Thammasing	Traditional boat race	Mixed 12 crews (U24) 250 m	May 13
67	Gold	Sanikun Tanasan	Weightlifting	Women's 49 kg	May 13
68	Gold	Nattaya Boochatham; Nanthita Boonsukham; Naruemol Chaiwai; Natthakan Chantam; Sunida Chaturongrattana; Onnicha Kamchomphu; Rosenanee Kanoh; Nannapat Koncharoenkai; Suleeporn Laomi; Banthida Leephatthana; Phannita Maya; Thipatcha Putthawong; Chanida Sutthiruang; Aphisara Suwanchonrathi; Sornnarin Tippoch	Cricket	Women's 50 overs	May 13
69	Gold	Pitama Thaweerattanasinp; Suphattra Jaikhumkao	Judo	Women's ju-no-kata	May 13
70	Gold	Thanarat Saengphet	Boxing	Men's Flyweight (51 kg)	May 13
71	Gold	Somchay Wongsuwam	Boxing	Men's Light welterweight (63.5 kg)	May 13
72	Gold	Jakkapong Yomkhot	Boxing	Men's Cruiserweight (86 kg)	May 13
73	Gold	Jutamas Jitpong	Boxing	Women's Bantamweight (54 kg)	May 13
74	Gold	Baison Manikon	Boxing	Women's Middleweight (75 kg)	May 13
75	Gold	Manlika Bunthod; Wiphada Chitphuan; Masaya Duangsri; Sirinan Khiaopak; Pruksa Maneewong; Somruedee Pruepruk; Kaewjai Pumsawangkaew; Payom Srihongsa; Ratsamee Thongsod	Sepak takraw	Women's team doubles	May 13
76	Gold	Varayut Jantarasena; Jantarit Khukaeo; Kritsanapong Nontakote; Jirasak Pakbuangoen; Poottipong Pukdee; Siriwat Sakha; Phutawan Sopa; Thawisak Thongsai; Pornthep Tinbangbon; Yodsawat Uthaijaronsri; Rachan Viphan; Pattarapong Yupadee	Sepak takraw	Men's team Regu	May 13
77	Gold	Julanan Khantikulanon	Taekwondo	Women's 46 kg	May 13
78	Gold	Phannapa Harnsujin	Taekwondo	Women's 57 kg	May 13
79	Gold	Luksika Kumkhum; Peangtarn Plipuech	Tennis	Women's doubles	May 14
80	Gold	Preecha Chanpa; Teerasak Chuden; Natthapon Kreepkamrai; Pitpiboon Mahawattanangkul; Photsawat Nachaikhong; Suttiphong Ngamkrabuan; Saharat Pholpikun; Sukrit Rakkarn; Phatthara Sangdet; Chetsadaporn Simma; Mongkhonchai Sisong; Theerapong Wonginta	Traditional boat race	Men's 12 crews (U24) 500 m	May 14
81	Gold	Suthasini Sawettabut; Orawan Paranang	Table tennis	Women's doubles	May 14
82	Gold	Natthapong Thuamcharoen	Boxing	Men's Mini flyweight (48 kg)	May 14
83	Gold	Bunjong Sinsiri	Boxing	Men's welterweight (67 kg)	May 14
84	Gold	Weerapon Jongjoho	Boxing	Men's Light heavyweight (80 kg)	May 14
85	Gold	Janjaem Suwannapheng	Boxing	Women's Light middleweight (69 kg)	May 14
86	Gold	Thanakrit Yodrak	Taekwondo	Men's Flyweight 58 kg	May 14
87	Gold	Panipak Wongpattanakit	Taekwondo	Women's Flyweight 49 kg	May 14
88	Gold	Sasikarn Tongchan	Taekwondo	Women's Lightweight 62 kg	May 14
89	Gold	Wuthiphat Sa-nguanwong	Finswimming	Men's 50 m bi-fins	May 14
90	Gold	Wuthiphat Sa-nguanwong	Finswimming	Men's 200 m surface	May 14
91	Gold	Nattaya Boochatham; Nanthita Boonsukham; Naruemol Chaiwai; Natthakan Chantam; Sunida Chaturongrattana; Onnicha Kamchomphu; Rosenanee Kanoh; Nannapat Koncharoenkai; Suleeporn Laomi; Banthida Leephatthana; Phannita Maya; Thipatcha Putthawong; Chanida Sutthiruang; Aphisara Suwanchonrathi; Sornnarin Tippoch	Cricket	T20	May 15
92	Gold	Supanida Katethong	Badminton	Women's singles	May 16

=== Silver ===
No.	Medal	Name	Sport	Event	Date
1	Silver	Nawin Kokaew; Panuwat Deeyatam	Jujitsu	Men's Duo	May 4
2	Silver	Dulyawat Kaewsriyong	Swimming	Men's 200 m individual medley	May 6
3	Silver	Kamonchanok Kwanmuang	Swimming	Women's 200 m butterfly	May 6
4	Silver	Orapa Senatham	Jujitsu	Women's ne-waza nogi 57 kg	May 6
5	Silver	Aisika Kaewyongkod	Endurance race	Women's individual Aquathlon	May 6
6	Silver	Setthapong Chanpet	Karate	Men's kumite -55 kg	May 6
7	Silver	Komin Naonon; Eekkawee Ruenphara; Kamol Prasert; Thongchai Sombatkerd; Khanawut Rungrot; Kittichai Khamsaenrach; Apisit Chaichana; Noppadon Khongthawthong	Sepak takraw	Men's Chinlone (Non-repetition primary)	May 6
8	Silver	Gatesinee Poyim; Jiraporn Palasri; Kanyarat Plabwangklam; Pimpika Moongsupeng; Pornpairin Paenthong; Sujittra Nawasimmah; Suwanna Petsamorn; Yowvalux Jaisue	Sepak takraw	Women's Chinlone (Non-repetition primary)	May 6
9	Silver	Kanyarat Bampenthan; Sutida Nakcharoensri	Vovinam	Women's Dual Form	May 6
10	Silver	Chainarong Yawanophat	Vovinam	Men's -65 kg	May 6
11	Silver	Keerati Sukprasart; Phunsiri Sirimongkhon; Supuksorn Nuntana; Warinthorn Phetpraphan	Cycling	Mixed cross country relay	May 7
12	Silver	Abdulkarim Koolee; Salwa Cheha; Sobri Cheni	Pencak silat	Men's Artistic Regu team	May 7
13	Silver	Chatmanee Jankiaw; Napawee Jankiaw	Soft tennis	Women's individual Double	May 7
14	Silver	Kamonchanok Kwanmuang	Swimming	Women's 200 m freestyle	May 7
15	Silver	Kamonchanok Kwanmuang	Swimming	Women's 200 m individual medley	May 7
16	Silver	Saovanee Boonanphai	Swimming	Women's 50 m backstroke	May 7
17	Silver	Kesinee Tabtrai	Vovinam	Women's 60 kg	May 7
18	Silver	Mingkamon Koomphon	Athletics	Women's hammer throw	May 8
19	Silver	Sarawut Nuansi; Benny Nontanam; Joshua Atkinson; Supanich Poolkerd	Athletics	Mixed 4 x 400 m Relay	May 8
20	Silver	Arthit Mikhail Romanyk	Sailing	Men's ILCA 7	May 8
21	Silver	Thanapat Siricharoen	Sailing	Mired ICLA 4 open	May 8
22	Silver	Dulyawat Kaewsriyong	Swimming	Men's 200 m freestyle	May 9
23	Silver	Jinjutha Pholjamjumrus	Swimming	Women's 400 m Individual medley	May 9
24	Silver	Kasinpob Chomchanad	Athletics	Men's pole vault	May 9
25	Silver	Tikumporn Surintornta	Gymnastics	Men's floor Exercise	May 9
26	Silver	Tikumporn Surintornta	Gymnastics	Men's vault	May 9
27	Silver	Gatesinee Poyim; Jiraporn Palasri; Kanyarat Plabwangklam; Pimpika Moongsupeng; Pornpairin Paenthong; Sujittra Nawasimma; Suwanna Petsamorn; Yowvalux Jaisue	Sepak takraw	Women's Chinlone (Non-Repetition Secondary)	May 9
28	Silver	Anawat Ger-a-prasitt; Supakit Jaroensil; Prasroedchai Nakphacharoensap; Phakkapon Thienchaipong; Sippakorn Thong-ngiu; Kawin Yannarit	Soft tennis	Men's team	May 9
29	Silver	Sarayut Srakaew	Pencak silat	Men's tanding class B (50–55kg)	May 10
30	Silver	Pornteb Pholkaew	Pencak silat	Men's tanding class E (65–70kg)	May 10
31	Silver	Tonnam Kanteemool; Thanonchai Janruksa; Navaphat Wongcharoen; Dulyawat Kaewsriyong	Swimming	Men's 4×100 m medley relay	May 10
32	Silver	Kamonchanok Kwanmuang; Napatsawan Jaritkla; Jinjutha Pholjamjumrus; Kornkarnjana Sapianchai	Swimming	Women's 4×200 m freestyle relay	May 10
33	Silver	Phiangkhwan Pawapotako	Swimming	Women's 200 m breaststroke	May 10
34	Silver	Anchisa Chanta; Luksika Kumkhum; Peangtarn Plipuech; Lanlana Tararudee	Tennis	Women's team	May 10
35	Silver	Soraoat Dapbang; Chayut Khongprasit; Tawatchai Himeat; Sittiporn Donpraitee	Athletics	Men's 4 x 100 m relay	May 10
36	Silver	Eila Galitsky	Golf	Women's individual	May 10
37	Silver	Natthaphon Dansungnoen	Athletics	Men's 400 m Hurdles	May 11
38	Silver	Kiadpradid Srisai	Athletics	Men's discus throw	May 11
39	Silver	Navaphat Wongcharoen	Swimming	Men's 200 m butterfly	May 11
40	Silver	Supanich Poolkerd	Athletics	Women's 100 m	May 12
41	Silver	Piyawat Aendu; Chayut Khongprasit; Muhamah Salaeh; Kobsit Sittichai	Athletics	Men's 4 x 400 m relay	May 12
42	Silver	Armen Pangchai	Wushu	Men's sanda 52 kg	May 12
43	Silver	Sasipha Chuphon; Nuttapat Kaewkan; Jiraphong Khetlak; Thunsinee Mookda; Chutiphon Pansoon	Taekwondo	Mixed freestyle team	May 12
44	Silver	Ramnarong Sawekwiharee	Taekwondo	Men's 54 kg	May 13
45	Silver	Chaichon Cho	Taekwondo	Men's 68 kg	May 13
46	Silver	Atichai Phoemsap	Boxing	Men's Light middleweight (71 kg)	May 13
47	Silver	Thada Somboon-uan	Weightlifting	Men's 55 kg	May 13
48	Silver	Lanlana Tararudee	Tennis	Women's singles	May 13
49	Silver	Worranittha Meesuparoon; Supatsorn Watcharaporn; Panyaroj Watthong	Gymnastic	Mixed trio	May 13
50	Silver	Chawisa Intakul	Gymnastic	Women's individual Aerobic	May 13
51	Silver	Chanokpon Jiumsukjai	Gymnastic	Men's individual Aerobic	May 13
52	Silver	Jutatip Maneephan	Cycling	Women's mass start	May 13
53	Silver	Pruchya Isaro; Peangtarn Plipuech	Tennis	Mixed doubles	May 13
54	Silver		Gymnastics	Gymnastics at the 2023 Southeast Asian Games	May 13
55	Silver	Preecha Chanpa; Teerasak Chuden; Pitpiboon Mahawattanangkul; Photsawat Nachaikhong; Suttiphong Ngamkrabuan; Chetsadaporn Simma; Mongkhonchai Sisong	Traditional boat race	Men's 5 crews (U24) 500 m	May 14
56	Silver	Sukon Boon-em; Kasemsit Borriboonwasin; Suradet Faengnoi; Panlop Jeenchai; Nattapon Kaewsri; Pornprom Kramsuk; Natthapon Kreepkamrai; Suwan Kwanthong; Watchara Muangkum; Phatthara Sangdet; Somchai Sangmuang; Chitsanupong Sangpan; Nopphadol Sangthuang; Phakdee Wannamanee	Traditional boat race	Men's 12 crews (open) 500 m	May 14
57	Silver	Suratwadee Yodsarn	Weightlifting	Women's 59 kg	May 14
58	Silver	Witsanu Chantri	Weightlifting	Men's 67 kg	May 14
59	Silver	Anucha Doungsri	Weightlifting	Men's 73 kg	May 14
60	Silver	Chinnaphat Chaloemchanen; Korakote Juengamnuaychai; Jadsadaporn Puengkuntod; Nattiphong Singkham	Fencing	Men's Epee team	May 14
61	Silver	Jetsadakorn Suksai	Judo	Men's combat 55 kg	May 14
62	Silver	Rujakran Juntrong	Boxing	Men's Lightweight (60 kg)	May 14
63	Silver	Jack Woody Mercer	Taekwondo	Men's Lightweight 74 kg	May 14
64	Silver	Napat Sritimongkol	Taekwondo	Bantamweight 63 kg	May 14
65	Silver	Sunny Akani	Billiards	Men's snooker singles	May 14
66	Silver	Paphonpach Wongaek	Finswimming	Men's 800 m surface	May 14
67	Silver	Nanthawat Panphuek	Wrestling	Men's Greco-Roman 130 kg	May 14

=== Bronze ===
No.	Medal	Name	Sport	Event	Date
1	Bronze	Nuchanat Singchalad	Jujitsu	Women's ne-waza gi 52 kg	May 4
2	Bronze	Thailand national cricket team Nopphon Senamontree; Chaloemwong Chatphaisan; Sorawat Desungnoen; Sittipong Hongsi; Chiraphong Liangwichian; Khanitson Namchaikul; Narawit Nuntarach; Chanchai Pengkumta; Satarut Rungrueang; Yodsak Saranonnakkun; Kamron Senamontree; Vichanath Singh; Phiriyapong Suanchuai; Kiatiwut Suttisan; Sirawit Takanta	Cricket	Men's 50 overs	May 6
3	Bronze	Sarocha Chuemsakul; Sirikan Sukpancharoen	Chess / Ouk chaktrang	Women's doubles 60-Minute	May 6
4	Bronze	Jinjutha Pholjamjumrus	Swimming	Women's 200 m butterfly	May 6
5	Bronze	Mia Millar; Kamonchanok Kwanmuang; Kornkarnjana Sapianchai; Jenjira Srisa-ard	Swimming	Women's 4x100 Freestyle relay	May 6
6	Bronze	Phanudet Khananpao; Phatchara Yantapanich; Inkawat Vichailakana	Karate	Men's Kata team	May 6
7	Bronze	Monsicha Sakulrattanatara	Karate	Women's Kata individual	May 6
8	Bronze	Chanyanut Chippensuk	Karate	Women's kumite -50 kg	May 6
9	Bronze	Yonthanan Phonkla	Cycling	Women's Mountain cross-country	May 6
10	Bronze	Dahalan Pohdingsamu	Vovinam	Men's Five-gate Form	May 6
11	Bronze	Kanyarat Bampenthan	Vovinam	Women's Dragon-tiger Form	May 6
12	Bronze	Nattapon Nakpinpart	Esports	Attack Online individual	May 6
13	Bronze	Kotchaphon Tangsrivong	Athletics	Women's 20km Walk	May 6
14	Bronze	Supan Thongphoo	Pétanque	Men's shooting	May 6
15	Bronze	Rodsukhon Thongthanom	Pétanque	Women's shooting	May 6
16	Bronze	Sukitpeerarat Jantanakha	Jujitsu	Men's ne-waza gi -69 kg	May 6
17	Bronze	Thitirat Sae-oung	Vovinam	Women's Ying Yang sword form	May 7
18	Bronze	Antonio Prise Soonthornchote; Frederick Lee Jones Lish; Moses Morgan; Chanatip Jakrawan	Basketball	Men's team 3x3	May 7
19	Bronze	Sirikamonnate Chokprasertkul	Karate	Women's kumite -55 kg	May 7
20	Bronze	Puwanat Sangdang; Akharapol Sriwiset; Nattapon Nakpinpart; Natthaphong Chueachai; Jeerasak Sengraka	Esports	Attack Online team	May 7
21	Bronze	Wistawas Phosawang; Kraiwich Thawichat; Tanwa Yongthong; Kritsada Chueamkaew; Sadakorn Vimuttanon; Aphiwat Thanperm; Ratthawit Khamkong; Worawut Kaeochianghwang; Chutiphong Samoema; Kritsana Phumee; Nattapong Trisom; Borirak Harapan; Chanachol Rungniyom; Suriya Kasonbua; Wirawat Singthong; Thanakrit Boon-Art; Tanakit Juntakian; Somrat Boontam	Hockey	Men's Indoor tournament	May 7
22	Bronze	Komkrit Keadnin	Jujitsu	Men's ne-waza nogi -56 kg	May 7
23	Bronze	Kunnapong Hasdee	Jujitsu	Men's ne-waza nogi -69 kg	May 7
24	Bronze	Benyatip Phumthong	Jujitsu	Women's ne-waza nogi -52 kg	May 7
25	Bronze	Teerapat Kanabkaew	Karate	Men's -84 kg	May 7
26	Bronze	Akkrachai Meekhong	Pétanque	Men's Single	May 7
27	Bronze	Kamonchanok Kwanmuang	Swimming	Women's 400 m freestyle	May 8
28	Bronze	Fonpray Yamsuan	Swimming	Women's 200 m backstroke	May 8
29	Bronze	Santhinee Jaisuekul	Billiards	Women's 3-Cushion carom single	May 8
30	Bronze	Suthon Yampinidl; Sutida Poonpat	Sailing	Mixed 29er open	May 8
31	Bronze	Phupakorn Wongthanachet	Vovinam	Men's Four-Element staff form	May 8
32	Bronze	Phupakorn Wongthanachet	Vovinam	Men's Ying Yang sword form	May 8
33	Bronze	Yonthanan Phonkla	Cycling	Men's Mountain bike Eliminate	May 8
34	Bronze	Sutida Nakcharoensri; Thitirat Sae-oung	Vovinam	Women's pair Knife form	May 9
35	Bronze	Dahalan Pohdingsamu; Phumin Sawatsai; Phupakorn Wongthanachet; Thitirat Sae-oung; Anupak Phetpoon	Vovinam	Women's Multiple Training	May 9
36	Bronze	Tayida Kosonkitja	Vovinam	Women's 65 kg	May 9
37	Bronze	Pimchanok Gerprasith; Chatmanee Jankiaw; Chatcha Klomkamol; Nannapas Lamthanthong; Thanpitcha Somsanit	Soft tennis	Women's team Event	May 9
38	Bronze	Apisit Chaichana; Eekkawee Ruenphara; Kamol Prasert; Khanawut Rungrot; Kittichai Khamsaenrach; Komin Naonon; Noppadon Kongthawhong; Thongchai Sombatkerd	Sepak takraw	Men's Chinlone (Non-Repetition Secondary)	May 9
39	Bronze	Thongsri Thamakord; Phantipha Wongchuvej	Pétanque	Women's doubles	May 9
40	Bronze	Poramin Danjirakul	Billiards	Men's snooker 6-red singles	May 9
41	Bronze	Yuttapop Pakpoj; Praprut Chaithanasakul	Billiards	Men's English Singles	May 9
42	Bronze	Patsapong Amsam-ang	Athletics	Men's pole vault	May 9
43	Bronze	Saovanee Boonamphai; Phurichaya Junyamitree; Jenjira Srisa-ard; Kamonchanok Kwanmuang	Swimming	Mixed 4 x 100 medlay relay	May 9
44	Bronze	Navaphat Wongcharoen	Swimming	Men's 100 m butterfly	May 9
45	Bronze				May 9
46	Bronze	Jenjira Srisaard	Swimming	Women's 50 m freestyle	May 10
47	Bronze	Aekarat Maehchi	Pencak silat	Men's tanding class F (70-75kg)	May 10
48	Bronze	Suthat Bunchit	Pencak silat	Men's tanding class G (75-80kg)	May 10
49	Bronze	Pimpirat Tonkhieo	Pencak silat	Men's tanding class H (80-85kg)	May 10
50	Bronze	Saranon Glompan	Pencak silat	Men's tanding class I (85-90kg)	May 10
51	Bronze	Firdao Duromae	Pencak silat	Women's tanding class A (45-50kg)	May 10
52	Bronze	Kawin Yannarit	Soft tennis	Men's singles	May 11
53	Bronze	Napawee Jankiaw	Soft tennis	Women's singles	May 11
54	Bronze	Padasak Tanviriyawechakul; Sarayut Tancharoen; Phakpoom Sanguansin	Table tennis	Men's team	May 11
55	Bronze	Phongsakorn Ainpu; Piyamart Prapassorn; Panukorn Roeksanit	Pétanque	Mixed triples (2 men and 1 woman)	May 11
56	Bronze	Sunisa Khotseemueang	Athletics	Women's Heptathlon	May 11
57	Bronze	Bandit Singhatongkul	Athletics	Men's discus throw	May 11
58	Bronze	Sukanya Janchaona; Benny Nontanam; Sasipim Satachot; Arisa Weruwanarak	Athletics	Women's 4 x 400 m relay	May 12
59	Bronze	Chanachai Kamolklang	Wushu	Men's sanda 65 kg	May 12
60	Bronze	Pitaya Yangrungrawin	Wushu	Men's nandao / Nangun	May 12
61	Bronze	Nattachai Sutha; Sippakorn Wetchakornpatiwong; Worapol Sianglio	Taekwondo	Men's recognized team	May 12
62	Bronze	Ornawee Srisahakit; Pichamon Limpaiboon; Ratchadawan Tapaenthong	Taekwondo	Women's recognized team	May 12
63	Bronze	Jenjira Srisaard; Kamonchanok Kwanmuang; Kornkarnjana Sapianchai; Mia Millar	Swimming	Women's 4 x 100 m freestyle relay	May 12
64	Bronze	Geargchai Rutnosot	Finswimming	Men's 100 m bi-fins	May 12
65	Bronze	Khet Chamnanwat	Finswimming	100 m surface	May 12
66	Bronze	Nusanee Chandaeng; Phanuphong Jarassri; Geargchai Rutnosot; Juthamas Sutthison	Finswimming	4 × 100 m bi-fins	May 12
67	Bronze	Nusanee Chandaeng; Warunee Intaraprasat Juthamas Sutthison; Nuchwara Vichaksanapong	Finswimming	4 × 200 m surface	May 12
68	Bronze	Anchisa Chanta	Tennis	Women's singles	May 12
69	Bronze	Thantub Suksumrarn; Luksika Kumkhum	Tennis	Mixed doubles	May 12
70	Bronze	Preecha Chanpa; Natthapon Kreepkamrai; Saharat Pholpikun; Sukrit Rakkarn; Phatthara Sangdet; Theerapong Wonginta	Traditional boat race	Men's 5 crews (U24) 250 m	May 13
71	Bronze	Teerapat Chomchuen	Weightlifting	Men's 61 kg	May 13
72	Bronze	Panchaya Channoi	Billiards	Women's 1-cushion carom	May 13
73	Bronze	Anchisa Chanta	Tennis	Women's singles	May 13
74	Bronze	Kasidit Samrej	Tennis	Men's singles	May 13

== Badminton ==
Men

Player	Event	Round of 32	Round of 16	Quarter-finals	Semi-finals	Final	Rank
Player	Event	Opponent Score	Opponent Score	Opponent Score	Opponent Score	Opponent Score	Rank
Sarab Jamsri; Ruttanapak Oupthong; Peeratchai Sukphun; Pakkapon Teeraratsakul; Panitchaphon Teeraratsakul; Sitthikom Thammasin; Nanthakarn Yordphaisong; Chaloempon Charoenkitamorn; Ratchapol Makkasasithorn; Parinyawat Thongnuam	Team	—N/a		Cambodia (CAM); W 3–0	Malaysia (MAS); L 2–3	—N/a	3rd place, bronze medalist(s)

Women

Player	Event	Round of 16	Quarter-finals	Semi-finals	Final	Rank
Player	Event	Opponent Score	Opponent Score	Opponent Score	Opponent Score	Rank
Benyapa Aimsaard; Nuntakarn Aimsaard; Lalinrat Chaiwan; Supanida Katethong; Jongkolphan Kititharakul; Pitchamon Opatniputh; Rawinda Prajongjai; Laksika Kanlaha; Chasinee Korepap; Phataimas Muenwong	Team	—N/a		Singapore (SGP); W 3–1	Indonesia (INA); W 3–0	1st place, gold medalist(s)

== Cricket ==
Summary

Team	Event	Group stage				Final / BM	
Team	Event	Opposition Result	Opposition Result	Opposition Result	Rank	Opposition Result	Rank
Thailand Men	Men's 50 overs	Malaysia; L 7 wickets	—N/a		2Q	Indonesia; W 3 wickets	3rd place, bronze medalist(s)
Thailand Men	Men's T20I	Indonesia; L 32 runs	Malaysia; L 8 wickets	—N/a	3	Did not Advance	
Thailand Men	Men's T10	Malaysia; L 53 runs	Singapore; W 7 wickets	—N/a	3	Did not Advance	
Thailand Women	Women's 50 overs	Myanmar; W 239 runs	Malaysia; W 8 wickets	—N/a	1Q	Indonesia; W 93 runs	1st place, gold medalist(s)
Thailand Women	Women's T20I	Philippines; W 10 wickets	Malaysia; W 12 runs	Myanmar; W 10 wickets	1Q	Indonesia; W 40 runs	1st place, gold medalist(s)
Thailand Women	Women's T10	Malaysia; W 6 wickets	Singapore; W 9 wickets	—N/a	1Q	Philippines; W 10 wickets	1st place, gold medalist(s)

== Floorball ==
Team	Event	Group Stage					Final / BM	
Team	Event	Opposition Score	Opposition Score	Opposition Score	Opposition Score	Rank	Opposition Score	Rank
Thailand men's	Men's tournament	Malaysia; W 10–2	Philippines; L 4–6	Cambodia; W 18–1	Singapore; W 4–3	2Q	Philippines; W 3–2	1st place, gold medalist(s)
Thailand women's	Women's tournament	Malaysia; W 5–2	Philippines; W 9–2	Cambodia; W 13–0	Singapore; W 3–1	2Q	Singapore; L 2–4	2nd place, silver medalist(s)
