= Sepak takraw at the 2023 SEA Games =

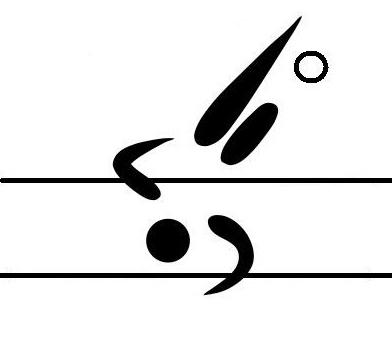
- Venue: Basketball Hall, Olympic Complex
- Location: Phnom Penh, Cambodia
- Dates: 6–16 May 2023

Sepak takraw and chinlone competitions at the 2023 SEA Games were held from 6–16 May 2023. The events were held in the Basketball Hall, Olympic Complex, Phnom Penh. A total of 22 medals were awarded.

2023 marked the return of chinlone to the SEA Games after a six-year absence.

== Medal table ==
* Host nation (Cambodia)

Rank	Nation	Gold	Silver	Bronze	Total
1	Thailand	7	3	1	11
2	Myanmar	6	5	2	13
3	Cambodia*	4	1	12	17
4	Indonesia	2	1	2	5
5	Laos	1	4	7	12
6	Vietnam	1	1	2	4
7	Malaysia	0	4	4	8
8	Philippines	0	2	1	3
9	Singapore	0	0	1	1
Totals (9 entries)		21	21	32	74

== Medal summary ==
=== Chinlone ===
==== Men ====
Event	Gold	Silver	Bronze
Linking	Laos; Adong Phoumisin; Aetlo Phonboun; Anousone Soundala; Aounkham Xaysongkham; Pamoo Inthilatvongsy; Phonesavanh Phimmachak; Souknilun Xaykongsa; Yothin Someathphouthone	Myanmar; Aung Nain Phyo Han; Duwun Kyaw; Kaung Myat Thiha; Khant Win Hein; Min Khant Win; Pyae Phyo Kaw; Sai Zaw Zaw; Thu Yein Lin	Malaysia; Mohd Nazuha Mohd Nadzli; Mohd Zarlizan Zakaria; Putera Aidil Israfil Kamaruzaman; Abdul Muhaimi Che Bongsu; Iskandar Zulkarnain Salim; Izuan Afendi Azlan; Muhammad Faiz Rozlan; Nur Hidayat Ar-Rasyid Ahmad Daud
Linking	Laos; Adong Phoumisin; Aetlo Phonboun; Anousone Soundala; Aounkham Xaysongkham; Pamoo Inthilatvongsy; Phonesavanh Phimmachak; Souknilun Xaykongsa; Yothin Someathphouthone	Myanmar; Aung Nain Phyo Han; Duwun Kyaw; Kaung Myat Thiha; Khant Win Hein; Min Khant Win; Pyae Phyo Kaw; Sai Zaw Zaw; Thu Yein Lin	Cambodia; Dy Chanthea; Kien Korn; Ngorn Theara; Nuth Visal; Oum Sansovin; Pheng Mithona; Phom Kongkia; Seng Sovannara
Non-repetition primary	Cambodia; Chhorn Sokhom; Cheat Khemrin; Sen Sie; Oum Sansovin; Houth Sovoutha; Dem Tiya; Nom Hapchhun; Heng Rawut	Thailand; Komin Naonon; Eekkawee Ruenphara; Kamol Prasert; Thongchai Sombatkerd; Khanawut Rungrot; Kittichai Khamsaenrach; Apisit Chaichana; Noppadon Khongthawthong	Malaysia; Iskandar Zulkarnain Salim; Izuan Afendi Azlan; Nur Hidayat Arrasyid Ahmad Daud; Muhammad Faiz Rozlan; Abdul Muhaimmi Che Bongsu; Mohd Zarlizan Zakaria; Mohd Nazuha Mohd Nadzli; Putera Aidil Israfil Kamaruzaman
Non-repetition primary	Cambodia; Chhorn Sokhom; Cheat Khemrin; Sen Sie; Oum Sansovin; Houth Sovoutha; Dem Tiya; Nom Hapchhun; Heng Rawut	Thailand; Komin Naonon; Eekkawee Ruenphara; Kamol Prasert; Thongchai Sombatkerd; Khanawut Rungrot; Kittichai Khamsaenrach; Apisit Chaichana; Noppadon Khongthawthong	Laos; Phonesavanh Phimmachak; Yothin Sombathphouthone; Anousone Soundala; Ladsamee Xamounty; Adong Phoumisin; Aetlo Phonboun; Souknilun Xaykongsya; Pamod Inthilatvongsy
Non-repetition secondary	Myanmar; Duwun Kyaw; Kaung Myat Thiha; Khant Win Hein; Min Khant Win; Min Thit Sar Aung; Wai Yan Phyo; Ya Wai Aung; Zaw Lin Maung	Laos; Adong Phoumisin; Aetlo Phonboun; Anousone Soundala; Aounkham Xaysongkham; Pamod Inthilatvongsy; Phonesavanh Phimmachak; Souknilun Xaykongsa; Yothin Sombathphouthone	Cambodia; Chan Minea; Chhorn Sokhom; Di Chanthea; Heng Rawut; Nom Hapchhun; Nuth Visal; Sen Sier; Seng Sovannara
Non-repetition secondary	Myanmar; Duwun Kyaw; Kaung Myat Thiha; Khant Win Hein; Min Khant Win; Min Thit Sar Aung; Wai Yan Phyo; Ya Wai Aung; Zaw Lin Maung	Laos; Adong Phoumisin; Aetlo Phonboun; Anousone Soundala; Aounkham Xaysongkham; Pamod Inthilatvongsy; Phonesavanh Phimmachak; Souknilun Xaykongsa; Yothin Sombathphouthone	Thailand; Apisit Chaichana; Eekkawee Ruenphara; Kamol Prasert; Khanawut Rungrot; Kittichai Khamsaenrach; Komin Naonon; Noppadon Kongthawhong; Thongchai Sombatkerd
Same strokes	Thailand; Apisit Chaichana; Eekkawee Ruenphara; Kamol Prasert; Khanawut Rungrot; Kittichai Khamsaenrach; Komin Naonon; Noppadon Kongthawhong; Thongchai Sombatkerd	Malaysia; Abdul Muhaimi Che Bongsu; Iskandar Zulkarnain Salim; Izuan Afendi Azlan; Mohd Nazuha Mohd Nadzli; Mohd Zarlizan Zakaria; Muhammad Faiz Rozlan; Nur Hidayat Ar-Rasyid Ahmad Daud; Putera Aidil Israfil Kamaruzaman	Cambodia; Heng Rawut; Houth Sovoutha; Kien Korn; Ngorn Theara; Peng Mithona; Phom Kongkia; Sam Veasna; Sorn Channem
Same strokes	Thailand; Apisit Chaichana; Eekkawee Ruenphara; Kamol Prasert; Khanawut Rungrot; Kittichai Khamsaenrach; Komin Naonon; Noppadon Kongthawhong; Thongchai Sombatkerd	Malaysia; Abdul Muhaimi Che Bongsu; Iskandar Zulkarnain Salim; Izuan Afendi Azlan; Mohd Nazuha Mohd Nadzli; Mohd Zarlizan Zakaria; Muhammad Faiz Rozlan; Nur Hidayat Ar-Rasyid Ahmad Daud; Putera Aidil Israfil Kamaruzaman	Myanmar; Aung Myint Myat; Kaung Myat Thiha; Min Thit Sar Aung; Pyae Phyo Kyaw; Thaw Wai Zin; Thu Yein Lin; Wai Yan Phyo; Ya Wai Aung

==== Women ====
Event	Gold	Silver	Bronze
Linking	Thailand; Gatsinee Poyim; Jiraporn Palasri; Kanyarat Plabwangklam; Pimpika Mueangsupeng; Pornpairin Paenthong; Suchittra Nawasimma; Suwanna Petsamorn; Yaowaluck Jaisue	Myanmar; Hmone Nant Thar; Hnin Wutt Yee Bo; Khaing Tha Zin Phyo; Lai Wady Zaw; May Phue Han; May Phyo San; Nyen Ei Mon; Shun Lae Wai	Laos; Damdduane Lattanavongsa; Ladsamee Vilaysouk; May Phiathep; Philavane Chanthasily; Santisouk Chandala; Soulinthone Soneamphay; Soukthavone Douangtha; Vansone Bouavang
Linking	Thailand; Gatsinee Poyim; Jiraporn Palasri; Kanyarat Plabwangklam; Pimpika Mueangsupeng; Pornpairin Paenthong; Suchittra Nawasimma; Suwanna Petsamorn; Yaowaluck Jaisue	Myanmar; Hmone Nant Thar; Hnin Wutt Yee Bo; Khaing Tha Zin Phyo; Lai Wady Zaw; May Phue Han; May Phyo San; Nyen Ei Mon; Shun Lae Wai	Cambodia; Chea Raksmei; Ly Sreypich; Pen Dinet; Pho Panha; San Bopha; San Sophorn; Vann Socheata; Yong Vuoch Ly
Non-repetition primary	Cambodia; Chea Raksmei; Ly Sreypich; Nuth Karona; Orm Vuoch Leang; Pho Panha; San Sophorn; Un Sreynich; Vann Socheata	Thailand; Gatsinee Poyim; Jiraporn Palasri; Kanyarat Plabwangklam; Pimpika Mueangsupeng; Pornpairin Paenthong; Suchittra Nawasimma; Suwanna Petsamorn; Yaowaluck Jaisue	Laos; Damdouane Lattanavongsa; Ladsamee Vilaysouk; May Phiathep; Philavane Chanthasily; Santisouk Chandala; Soulinthone Soneamphay; Soukthavone Douangta; Vansone Bouavang
Non-repetition secondary	Myanmar; Aye Aye Thant; Hmone Nant Thar; Khaing Khaing; May Phue Han; Su Twal Tar; Thae Thae; Tint Nilar Win; Yin Min Htwe	Thailand; Gatsinee Poyim; Jiraporn Palasri; Kanyarat Plabwangklam; Pimpika Mueangsupeng; Pornpairin Paenthong; Suchittra Nawasimma; Suwanna Petsamorn; Yaowaluck Jaisue	Cambodia; Nuth Karona; Orm Vuoch Leang; Pho Panha; San Bopha; San Sophorn; Un Sreynich; Vann Socheata; Yong Vuoch Ly
Same stroke	Myanmar; Aye Aye Thant; Khaing Khaing; Khaing Tha Zin Phyo; May Phyo San; Su Twal Tar; Thae Thae; Tint Nilar Win; Yin Min Htwe	Cambodia; Chea Raksmei; Ly Srey Pich; Nuth Karona; Orm Vuoch Leang; Pho Panha; San Sophorn; Un Sreynich; Vann Socheata	Laos; Damdouane Lattanavongsa; Ladsamee Vilaysouk; May Phiathep; Philavane Chanthasily; Santisouk Chandala; Soulinthone Soneamphay; Soukthavone Douangtha; Vansone Bouavang

==== Mixed ====
Event	Gold	Silver	Bronze
Linking	Myanmar; Aung Myint Myat; Aung Naing Phyo Han; Hnin Wutt Yee Bo; Lai Wady Zaw; Nyein Ei Mon; Sai Zaw Zaw; Shun Lae Wai; Thaw Wai Zin	Laos; Adong Phoumisin; Anousone Soundala; Aounkham Xaysongkham; Ladsamee Vilaysouk; May Phiathep; Philavane Chanthasily; Vansone Bouavang; Yothin Sombathphouthone	Cambodia; Chan Minea; Chea Raksmei; Chhorn Saikhom; Dem Tiya; Ly Sreypich; Nuth Karona; Phom Kongkia; Vann Socheata
Same stroke	Cambodia; Chea Raksmei; Heng Rawut; Nuth Karona; Nuth Visal; Pen Dinet; Sam Veasna; San Sophorn; Sorn Channem	Myanmar; Hmone Nant Thar; Khaing Tha Zin Phyo; Kyant Win Hein; May Phue Han; May Phyo San; Wai Yan Phyo; Ya Wai Aung; Zaw Lin Maung	Laos; Adong Phoumisin; Anousone Soundala; Damdouane Lattanavongsa; Ladsamee Vilaysouk; Phonsavanh Phimmachak; Soukthavone Douangtha; Vansone Bouavang; Yothin Someathphouthone
Non-repetition primary	Cambodia; Cheat Khemrin; Chhorn Sokhom; Heng Rawut; Nhoem Sreyneat; Orm Vuoch Leang; Pho Panha; Sen Sie; Un Sreynich	Laos; Adong Phoumisin; Aetlo Phonboun; Anousone Soundala; Philavane Chanthasily; Santisouk Chandala; Soulinthone Soneamphay; Soukthavone Douangta; Yothin Sombathphouthone	only two competitors

=== Sepak takraw ===
Men

Event	Gold	Silver	Bronze
Regu	Thailand; Varayut Jantarasena; Kritsanapong Nontakote; Siriwat Sakha; Thawisak Thongsai; Pattarapong Yupadee	Malaysia; Amirul Zazwan Amir; Mohd Azlan Alias; Mohd Syahir Rosdi; Muhd Afifuddin Razali; Muhd Zulkifli Abd Razak	Cambodia; Kien Korn; Pheng Mithona; Sam Veasna; Sen Si E Sorn Channem
Regu	Thailand; Varayut Jantarasena; Kritsanapong Nontakote; Siriwat Sakha; Thawisak Thongsai; Pattarapong Yupadee	Malaysia; Amirul Zazwan Amir; Mohd Azlan Alias; Mohd Syahir Rosdi; Muhd Afifuddin Razali; Muhd Zulkifli Abd Razak	Singapore; Khairul Fahmi Yazid; Muhd Afif Safiee; Muhd Asri Aron; Muhd Danish Irfan Faizal; Muhd Ramli Sa'ari
Team Regu	Thailand; Varayut Jantarasena; Jantarit Khukaeo; Kritsanapong Nontakote; Jirasak Pakbuangoen; Poottipong Pukdee; Siriwat Sakha; Phutawan Sopa; Thawisak Thongsai; Pornthep Tinbangbon; Yodsawat Uthaijaronsri; Rachan Viphan; Pattarapong Yupadee	Malaysia; Amirul Zazwan Amir; Mohd Azlan Alias; Mohd Syahir Rosdi; Aidil Aiman Azwawi; Meor Mohd Zulfikar Mat Amin; Muhd Afifuddin Razali; Muhd Haziq Hairul Nizam; Muhd Noraizat Nordin; Norfaizzul Abd Razak; Muhd Zulkifli Abd Razak; Muhd Hafizul Hayazi Adnan; Khairol Zaman Hamir Akhbar	Cambodia; Chan Minea; Di Chanthea; Houth Sovoutha; Kien Korn; Ngorn Theara; Oum Sansovin; Pheng Mithona; Phom Kongkia; Sam Veasna; Sen Si E Seng Sovannara; Sorn Channem
Doubles	Indonesia; Rusdi; Saiful Rijal; Muh. Hardiansyah Muliang	Malaysia; Aidil Aiman Azwawi; Muhd Noraizat Nordin; Muhd Hafizul Hayazi Adnan	Philippines; Jason Huerte; Elly Jan Nituda; Rheyjey Ortouste
Doubles	Indonesia; Rusdi; Saiful Rijal; Muh. Hardiansyah Muliang	Malaysia; Aidil Aiman Azwawi; Muhd Noraizat Nordin; Muhd Hafizul Hayazi Adnan	Myanmar; Sitt Lin Htut; Thant Zin Oo; Zin Ko Ko
Team doubles	Indonesia; Abdul Muin; Andi Try Sandi Saputra; Anwar Budiyanto; Diky Apriyadi; Jelki Ladada; Muh. Hardiansyah Muliang; Muhammad Hafidz; Rusdi; Syaiful Rijal	Myanmar; Aung Myo Naing; Aung Myo Swe; Aung Zaw; Shein Wunna Zaw; Sitt Lin Htut; Than Zaw Oo; Thant Zin Oo; Wai Lin Aung; Zin Ko Ko	Laos; Laksanaxay Bounphaivanh; Khammeung Monphachan; Sommanyvanh Phakonekham; Bounyong Phetsakhone; Khamlek Sodahuk; Noum Souvannalith; Saviden Vorlavongsa; Toule Xaiyavongsone; Kongsy Yang
Team doubles	Indonesia; Abdul Muin; Andi Try Sandi Saputra; Anwar Budiyanto; Diky Apriyadi; Jelki Ladada; Muh. Hardiansyah Muliang; Muhammad Hafidz; Rusdi; Syaiful Rijal	Myanmar; Aung Myo Naing; Aung Myo Swe; Aung Zaw; Shein Wunna Zaw; Sitt Lin Htut; Than Zaw Oo; Thant Zin Oo; Wai Lin Aung; Zin Ko Ko	Vietnam; Đầu Văn Hoàng; Huy Manh Ha; Huỳnh Ngọc Sang; Ngô Thành Long; Nguyễn Hoàng Lân; Nguyễn Huy Quyền; Nguyễn Văn Lý; Tăng Minh Khoa; Vương Minh Châu
Quadrant	Thailand; Kritsanapong Nontakote; Phutawan Sopa; Thawisak Thongsai; Pornthep Tinbangbon; Yodsawat Uthaijaronsri; Rachan Viphan	Indonesia; Andi Try Sandi Saputra; Diky Apriyadi; Muh. Hardiansyah Muliang; Muhammad Hafidz; Rusdi; Saiful Rijal	Cambodia; Kien Korn; Ngorn Theara; Nom Hapchhun; Sam Veasna; Sen Si E Sorn Channem
Quadrant	Thailand; Kritsanapong Nontakote; Phutawan Sopa; Thawisak Thongsai; Pornthep Tinbangbon; Yodsawat Uthaijaronsri; Rachan Viphan	Indonesia; Andi Try Sandi Saputra; Diky Apriyadi; Muh. Hardiansyah Muliang; Muhammad Hafidz; Rusdi; Saiful Rijal	Vietnam; Đầu Văn Hoàng; Huỳnh Ngọc Sang; Nguyễn Hoàng Lân; Nguyễn Huy Quyền; Nguyễn Văn Lý; Vương Minh Châu
Hoop	Myanmar; Aung Kyaw Moe; Aung Zaw; Kyaw Zayar Win; Than Zaw Oo; Thein Zaw Min; Zin Ko Ki	Philippines; Jason Bobier; Joshua Bullo; Ronsited Gabayeron; Jason Huerte; Rheyjey Ortouste; Vince Torno	Cambodia; Cheat Khemrin; Chhorn Sokhom; Heng Rawut; Houth Sovoutha; Nom Hapchhun; Nuth Visal

Women

Event	Gold	Silver	Bronze
Doubles	Vietnam; Nguyễn Thị Ngọc Huyền; Nguyễn Thị Yến; Trần Thị Ngọc Yến	Myanmar; Khin Hnin Wai; Phyu Phyu Than; Yamon Zin	Indonesia; Fujy Anggy Lestari; Kusnelia; Lena
Doubles	Vietnam; Nguyễn Thị Ngọc Huyền; Nguyễn Thị Yến; Trần Thị Ngọc Yến	Myanmar; Khin Hnin Wai; Phyu Phyu Than; Yamon Zin	Laos; Sonsavan Keosouliya; Norkham Vongxay; Koy Xayavong
Team doubles	Thailand; Manlika Bunthod; Wiphada Chitphuan; Masaya Duangsri; Sirinan Khiaopak; Pruksa Maneewong; Somruedee Pruepruk; Kaewjai Pumsawangkaew; Payom Srihongsa; Ratsamee Thongsod	Laos; Lae Inthavong; Sonsavan Keosouliya; Naem Lattanabounmee; Neechapad Mapha; Namfonh Morladok; Aksonesavanh Philavong; Koy Xayavong; Nouandam Volabouth; Norkham Vongxay	Malaysia; Siti Norzubaidah Wahab; Nur Natasha Amyra Fazil; Nur Syafiqah Jafri; Nur Fatihah Sharudin; Madziatul Rosmahani Saidin; Nur Athirah Roslan; Razmah Adam; Nadillatul Rosmahani Saidin; Sharifah Fifi Nurdyana Rahim
Team doubles	Thailand; Manlika Bunthod; Wiphada Chitphuan; Masaya Duangsri; Sirinan Khiaopak; Pruksa Maneewong; Somruedee Pruepruk; Kaewjai Pumsawangkaew; Payom Srihongsa; Ratsamee Thongsod	Laos; Lae Inthavong; Sonsavan Keosouliya; Naem Lattanabounmee; Neechapad Mapha; Namfonh Morladok; Aksonesavanh Philavong; Koy Xayavong; Nouandam Volabouth; Norkham Vongxay	Cambodia; Chea Raksmei; Ly Srey Pich; Nuth Karona; Orm Vuoch Leang; Pen Dinet; Pho Panha; San Sophorn; Un Sreynich; Vann Socheata
Quadrant	Thailand; Manlika Bunthod; Wiphada Chitphuan; Masaya Duangsri; Sirinan Khiaopak; Pruksa Maneewong; Somruedee Pruepruk	Vietnam; Nguyễn Thị Khánh Ly; Nguyễn Thị Mỹ; Nguyễn Thị Ngọc Huyền; Nguyễn Thị Thu Trang; Nguyễn Thị Yến; Trần Thị Ngọc Yến	Indonesia; Asmaul Husna; Dita Pratiwi; Fitra Siu; Kusnelia; Lena; Wan Annisa Rachmadi
Quadrant	Thailand; Manlika Bunthod; Wiphada Chitphuan; Masaya Duangsri; Sirinan Khiaopak; Pruksa Maneewong; Somruedee Pruepruk	Vietnam; Nguyễn Thị Khánh Ly; Nguyễn Thị Mỹ; Nguyễn Thị Ngọc Huyền; Nguyễn Thị Thu Trang; Nguyễn Thị Yến; Trần Thị Ngọc Yến	Malaysia; Madziatul Rosmahani Saidin; Nur Athirah Roslan; Nur Fatihah Sharudin; Nur Natasha Amyra Fazil; Razmah Adam; Siti Norzubaidah Wahab
Hoop	Myanmar; Hsu Tin Zar Naing; Khin Hnin Wai; Kyu Kyu Thin; Naing Naing Win; Nwe Nwe Htwe; Phyu Phyu Than	Philippines; Deseree Autor; Allyssa Bandoy; Kristine Lapsit; Mary Ann Lopez; Abegail Sinogbuhan; Jean Marie Sucalit	Cambodia; Chea Raksmei; Nuth Karona; Orm Vuoch Leang; Pho Panha; San Sophorn; Un Sreynich
