= Ratchanon Chantananuwat =

Thai amateur golfer (born 2007)

Personal information
- Nickname: TK
- Nationality: Thailand
- Born: 4 March 2007 (age 19) Bangkok, Thailand

Career
- Sport: Golf
- College: Stanford University
- Turned professional: 2026
- Professional wins: 1

Number of wins by tour
- Asian Tour: 1
Medal record
Men's golf
Representing Thailand
SEA Games
Gold medal – first place	2023 Phnom Penh	Team
Silver medal – second place	2021 Hanoi	Team

Ratchanon "TK" Chantananuwat (Thai: รัชชานนท์ ฉันทนานุวัฒน์; born 4 March 2007) is a Thai professional golfer who won the Trust Golf Asian Mixed Cup on the Asian Tour as an amateur in April 2022. He became the youngest golfer to win on a tour recognized by the Official World Golf Ranking at the age of 15 years and 37 days.

== Early life ==
Chantananuwat was born in Bangkok, Thailand. He began playing golf at the age of three. His nickname, "TK", is derived from the initials of his parents. His father has acted as his caddie and coach, and Chantananuwat has also been mentored by Thongchai Jaidee.

== Amateur career ==
Chantananuwat recorded several notable junior and amateur results before his breakthrough on the Asian Tour. In 2020, at the age of 13 years, four months and 18 days, he became the youngest player to make the cut on the All Thailand Golf Tour, finishing tied for 36th at the Singha Pattaya Open. Later that year, while still four months short of his 14th birthday, he retained his Faldo Series Hua Hin title at Banyan Golf Club, finishing on 14-under-par 202 and winning by nine strokes.

In November 2021, Chantananuwat made the cut on his Asian Tour debut at the Blue Canyon Phuket Championship. At 14 years and 286 days old, he became the third-youngest player to make the cut on the tour, after rounds of 71 and 72. He closed with a seven-under-par 65 and finished tied for 15th at 12-under-par. In January 2022, he finished third at The Singapore International on the Asian Tour.

In April 2022, Chantananuwat won the Trust Golf Asian Mixed Cup, an Asian Tour event held at Siam Country Club in Thailand, defeating Tom Kim by two strokes. At 15 years and 37 days old, he became the youngest winner of an Official World Golf Ranking event.

At the 2021 SEA Games in Vietnam, held in May 2022, Chantananuwat was part of Thailand's silver medal-winning men's team. He won his match in the final, but Thailand lost 2–1 to Malaysia.

Later in 2022, Chantananuwat played in the inaugural LIV Golf Invitational London at Centurion Club while still an amateur, finishing tied for 38th.

In February 2023, Chantananuwat made the cut at the PIF Saudi International on the Asian Tour and finished tied for 66th. During the tournament, he had opened with rounds of 67 and 66 to sit tied for sixth after 36 holes.

At the 2023 SEA Games in Cambodia, he was part of the Thai men's team with Arsit Areephun and Jiradech Chaowarat. Thailand defeated Vietnam 2–1 in the final to win the gold medal.

In June 2023, Chantananuwat entered The Amateur Championship at Hillside Golf Club in England. He reached the semi-finals, where he was defeated by Ronan Kleu.

Chantananuwat returned to the PIF Saudi International in 2024 and finished tied for ninth.

Chantananuwat reached as high as sixth in the World Amateur Golf Ranking. When he joined Stanford University, he was ranked 55th in the WAGR.

== College career ==
Chantananuwat joined the Stanford Cardinal men's golf team for the 2024–25 season. As a freshman, he was named to the All-ACC Academic team and recorded a scoring average of 71.57 over 30 rounds. He had two top-10 finishes and five top-20 finishes, with a low round of 66 at the 2025 Amer Ari Intercollegiate and a best finish of eighth at the Western Intercollegiate.

During his sophomore season, Chantananuwat was removed from Stanford's roster after what head coach Conrad Ray described as a violation of team rules. Golf Channel reported that he had played 17 events for Stanford over two seasons, recording four top-10 finishes, including a runner-up finish at The Prestige earlier in 2026.

== Amateur wins ==
- 2020 TJDT Invitational, Faldo Series Thailand Championship - Hua Hin

== Professional wins (1) ==
=== Asian Tour wins (1) ===
No.	Date	Tournament	Winning score	Margin of victory	Runner-up
1	10 Apr 2022	Trust Golf Asian Mixed Cup^{1} (as an amateur)	−20 (63-70-70-65=268)	2 strokes	(South Korea) Tom Kim

^{1}Mixed event with the Ladies European Tour

== Team appearances ==
- SEA Games (representing Thailand): 2021, 2023 (winners)
