= Brunei at the 2023 SEA Games =

- IOC code: BRU
- NOC: Brunei Darussalam National Olympic Council
- Website: www.bruneiolympic.org

in Phnom Penh, Cambodia 5–17 May 2023
- Competitors: 65 in 12 sports
- Flag bearer: Ali Saifullah Suhaimi (Pencak silat)
- Medals Ranked 10th: Gold 2 Silver 1 Bronze 6 Total 9

SEA Games appearances (overview)
- 1977; 1979; 1981; 1983; 1985; 1987; 1989; 1991; 1993; 1995; 1997; 1999; 2001; 2003; 2005; 2007; 2009; 2011; 2013; 2015; 2017; 2019; 2021; 2023; 2025; 2027; 2029

Brunei competed in the 32nd SEA Games which was held from 5 to 17 May 2023 in Phnom Penh, Cambodia. Brunei delegation to the 2023 Southeast Asian Games composed of 113 athletes, officials, and coaches, the smallest contingent among all participant nations.

== Medal summary ==
=== Medal by Sport ===
Sport	1st place, gold medalist(s)	2nd place, silver medalist(s)	3rd place, bronze medalist(s)	Total
Wushu	2	0	2	4
Pencak silat	0	1	1	2
Karate	0	0	2	2
Badminton	0	0	1	1
Total	2	1	6	9

=== Medal by gender ===
Medals by gender
Gender	1st place, gold medalist(s)	2nd place, silver medalist(s)	3rd place, bronze medalist(s)	Total	Percentage
Male	2	0	4	6	66.7%
Female	0	1	1	2	22.2%
Mixed	0	0	1	1	11%
Total	2	1	6	9	100%

=== Medal by date ===
Medals by date
Date	1st place, gold medalist(s)	2nd place, silver medalist(s)	3rd place, bronze medalist(s)	Total
4 May	0	0	0	0
5 May	Opening ceremony			
6 May	0	0	1	1
7 May	0	1	0	1
8 May	0	0	0	0
9 May	0	0	0	0
10 May	1	0	0	1
11 May	1	0	1	2
12 May	0	0	0	0
13 May	0	0	1	1
14 May	0	0	0	0
15 May	0	0	0	0
16 May	0	0	0	0
17 May	Closing ceremony			
Total	2	1	6	9

== Medalists ==
Medal	Name	Sport	Event	Date
Gold	Mohammad Adi Salihin	Wushu	Men's nanquan	May 10
Gold	Hosea Wong Zheng Yu	Wushu	Men's taijiquan + taijijian	May 10
Silver	Anisah Najihah; Norleyermah binti Haji Raya; Nur Wasiqah Aziemah	Pencak silat	Women's artistic regu (team)	May 4
Bronze	Mohammad Hazim Ramliee; Muhammad Haziq Aqwa MD Iman Safwan; Muhd Ali Saifullah Abdullah MD Suhaimi	Pencak silat	Men's artistic regu (team)	May 4
Bronze	Ahmad Mahyuddin HJ Abas; AK Azri Safwan PG HJ Jofri; Mohammad Shahirul Mohd Jenin; Nuraqilah HJ Shahroney; Siti Marinah Mohd Salleh; Woo Chang Huei	Badminton	Mixed team (special events)	May 6
Bronze	Basma Lachkar	Wushu	Women's taijiquan + taijijian	May 6
Bronze	Majdurano Joel bin Majallah Sain; Abel Lim Wee Yuen	Wushu	Men's duilian	May 6
Bronze	Muhammad Harith Dahlan	Karate	Men's -55 kg kumite	May 7
Bronze	MD Izzuddin Irfan MD Faizal	Karate	Men's +84 kg kumite	May 13
