= Vovinam at the 2023 SEA Games =

- Venue: Chroy Changvar Convention Centre
- Location: Phnom Penh, Cambodia
- Dates: 6–9 May 2023

Vovinam at the 2023 SEA Games was contested from 6 to 9 May 2023 at Hall F, Chroy Changvar Convention Centre in Phnom Penh, capital of Cambodia.

== Medal table ==
* Host nation (Cambodia)

Rank	Nation	Gold	Silver	Bronze	Total
1	Cambodia*	10	8	9	27
2	Vietnam	7	12	1	20
3	Thailand	5	3	8	16
4	Myanmar	4	3	17	24
5	Indonesia	3	1	14	18
6	Laos	1	1	5	7
7	Philippines	0	2	6	8
Totals (7 entries)		30	30	60	120

== Medal summary ==
=== Combat ===
Event	Gold	Silver	Bronze
Men's –55 kg	Wichian Sripaengpong; Thailand	Um Nimol; Cambodia	Jerome Maglasang Alidon; Philippines
Men's –55 kg	Wichian Sripaengpong; Thailand	Um Nimol; Cambodia	Kham Sisack; Laos
Men's –60 kg	Nguyễn Thanh Liêm; Vietnam	Emmanuel Dailay Cantores; Philippines	Aung Khant Zaw; Myanmar
Men's –60 kg	Nguyễn Thanh Liêm; Vietnam	Emmanuel Dailay Cantores; Philippines	Ananthasak Souliyavong; Laos
Men's –65 kg	Ekh Virekkamchitphouthong; Cambodia	Chainarong Yawanophat; Thailand	Nguyễn Viết Hà; Vietnam
Men's –65 kg	Ekh Virekkamchitphouthong; Cambodia	Chainarong Yawanophat; Thailand	Rhenel Guillermo Desuyo; Philippines
Men's –70 kg	Anupak Phetpoon; Thailand	Trương Văn Tuấn; Vietnam	I Nyoman Suryawan; Indonesia
Men's –70 kg	Anupak Phetpoon; Thailand	Trương Văn Tuấn; Vietnam	Kao Vichetrach; Cambodia
Women's –50 kg	Rattanaphon Hanphan; Thailand	Hnin Thet Wai; Myanmar	Him Danei; Cambodia
Women's –50 kg	Rattanaphon Hanphan; Thailand	Hnin Thet Wai; Myanmar	Aime Impas Ramos; Philippines
Women's –55 kg	Lê Thị Hiền; Vietnam	Alisa Panyasyli; Laos	Pech Chomno; Cambodia
Women's –55 kg	Lê Thị Hiền; Vietnam	Alisa Panyasyli; Laos	Jerlyn Cawaren; Philippines
Women's –60 kg	Đỗ Phương Thảo; Vietnam	Kesinee Tabtrai; Thailand	Sok Sophy; Cambodia
Women's –60 kg	Đỗ Phương Thảo; Vietnam	Kesinee Tabtrai; Thailand	Hnin Nandar Oo; Myanmar
Women's –65 kg	Bùi Thị Thảo Ngân; Vietnam	Hergie Tao-Wag Bacyadan; Philippines	Tayida Kosonkitja; Thailand
Women's –65 kg	Bùi Thị Thảo Ngân; Vietnam	Hergie Tao-Wag Bacyadan; Philippines	Chuk Somaly; Cambodia

=== Artistic ===
==== Men ====
Event	Gold	Silver	Bronze
Dual Form	Myanmar; Mana Kui; Tin Htoo Zaw	Vietnam; Bùi Hùng Cường; Nguyễn Văn Tiến	Cambodia; Met Sopheaktra; Met Sary
Dual Form	Myanmar; Mana Kui; Tin Htoo Zaw	Vietnam; Bùi Hùng Cường; Nguyễn Văn Tiến	Laos; Phokham Phommachanh; Phoutthasin Piengpanya
Pair Knife Form	Thailand; Dahalan Pohdingsamu; Phupakorn Wongthanachet	Cambodia; Met Sopheaktra; Met Sary	Myanmar; Aung Khaing Lin; Hein Htet Aung
Pair Knife Form	Thailand; Dahalan Pohdingsamu; Phupakorn Wongthanachet	Cambodia; Met Sopheaktra; Met Sary	Indonesia; I Putu Sudharma Putra; Kadek Edey Dwipayana
Pair Machete Form	Laos; Chanthalangsy Chanthasida; Phoutthasin Piengpanya	Vietnam; Đỗ Lý Minh Toàn; Nguyễn Trường Thọ	Indonesia; Efrie Surya Perdana; I Wayan Wisma Pratama Putra
Pair Machete Form	Laos; Chanthalangsy Chanthasida; Phoutthasin Piengpanya	Vietnam; Đỗ Lý Minh Toàn; Nguyễn Trường Thọ	Myanmar; Tin Htoo Zaw; Yar Zar Tun
Four-element Staff Form	Sean Chanhout; Cambodia	Tin Htoo Zaw; Myanmar	Kadek Dwi Dharmadi; Indonesia
Four-element Staff Form	Sean Chanhout; Cambodia	Tin Htoo Zaw; Myanmar	Phupakorn Wongthanachet; Thailand
Five-gate Form	Ly Boramy; Cambodia	Nguyễn Tứ Cường; Vietnam	Dahalan Pohdingsamu; Thailand
Five-gate Form	Ly Boramy; Cambodia	Nguyễn Tứ Cường; Vietnam	Kyaw Thu Soe Aung; Myanmar
Leg 4x	Myanmar; Aung Khaing Lin; Hein Htet Aung; Kyaw Thu Soe Aung; Yan Zar Tun	Vietnam; Mai Đình Chiến; Vũ Duy Bảo; Nguyễn Hoàng Dũ; Lê Phi Bảo; Nguyễn Quốc Cường	Cambodia; Chin Piseth; Chren Bunlong; Kao Vichetrach; Met Sopheaktra; San Socheat
Leg 4x	Myanmar; Aung Khaing Lin; Hein Htet Aung; Kyaw Thu Soe Aung; Yan Zar Tun	Vietnam; Mai Đình Chiến; Vũ Duy Bảo; Nguyễn Hoàng Dũ; Lê Phi Bảo; Nguyễn Quốc Cường	Indonesia; I Made Khrisna Dwipayana; I Wayan Purbawa; Efrie Surya Perdana; I Kadek Mogi Bahana Lenge; Dewa Gede Tomi Sanjaya
Multiple training	Vietnam; Mai Đình Chiến; Lê Đức Duy; Nguyễn Hoàng Tấn; Huỳnh Khắc Nguyên; Lê Phi Bảo	Cambodia; Chin Piseth; Chren Bunlong; Ny Tiza; San Socheat; Sao Savinn	Myanmar; Aik Soe Lin; Mana Kui; Myo Htet Zaw; Tun Win Naing
Multiple training	Vietnam; Mai Đình Chiến; Lê Đức Duy; Nguyễn Hoàng Tấn; Huỳnh Khắc Nguyên; Lê Phi Bảo	Cambodia; Chin Piseth; Chren Bunlong; Ny Tiza; San Socheat; Sao Savinn	Laos; Chanthalangsy Chanthasida; Ketsadaphone Chanthasida; Khitsana Sisongkham; Phoutthasone Piengpanya; Satsada Phommavong
Sun-moon Broadsword Form	Ly Boramy; Cambodia	Huỳnh Khắc Nguyên; Vietnam	Yar Zar Tun; Myanmar
Sun-moon Broadsword Form	Ly Boramy; Cambodia	Huỳnh Khắc Nguyên; Vietnam	Jovan Medallo; Philippines
Ying-yang Sword Form	Aik Soe Lin; Myanmar	Huỳnh Khắc Nguyên; Vietnam	Phupakorn Wongthanachet; Thailand
Ying-yang Sword Form	Aik Soe Lin; Myanmar	Huỳnh Khắc Nguyên; Vietnam	I Gusti Agung Ngurah Suardyana; Indonesia
Ying-yang Sword Form 4x	Cambodia; Im Langchhung; Ly Boramy; Men Sokvichheka; Meth Sary; Ny Tiza	Vietnam; Lê Đức Anh; Nguyễn Hoàng Dũ; Nguyễn Hoàng Tấn; Huỳnh Khắc Nguyên; Nguyễn Mạnh Phi	Myanmar; Aung Khant Min; Myo Htet Zaw; Sa Wai Lyain Htwe; Tun Win Naing
Ying-yang Sword Form 4x	Cambodia; Im Langchhung; Ly Boramy; Men Sokvichheka; Meth Sary; Ny Tiza	Vietnam; Lê Đức Anh; Nguyễn Hoàng Dũ; Nguyễn Hoàng Tấn; Huỳnh Khắc Nguyên; Nguyễn Mạnh Phi	Indonesia; Dewa Gede Tomi Sanjaya; I Gusti Agung Gede Ary Wirawan; I Nyoman Suryawan; I Wayan Sumertayasa; Kadek Edey Dwipayana

==== Women ====
Event	Gold	Silver	Bronze
Dual Form	Myanmar; Khine War Phoo; May Han Ni Aung Lwin	Thailand; Kanyarat Bampenthan; Sutida Nakcharoensri	Indonesia; Ni Wayan Vina Puspita; Kade Ayu Mas Sasvita Dewi
Dual Form	Myanmar; Khine War Phoo; May Han Ni Aung Lwin	Thailand; Kanyarat Bampenthan; Sutida Nakcharoensri	Cambodia; Pov Sokha; Sok Nidanut
Pair Knife Form	Indonesia; Ni Made Purnami; Putu Wahana Maha Yoni	Cambodia; Khorn Chansopheakneth; Sok Nidanut	Myanmar; Eain Dray Phoo; May Han Ni Aung Lwin
Pair Knife Form	Indonesia; Ni Made Purnami; Putu Wahana Maha Yoni	Cambodia; Khorn Chansopheakneth; Sok Nidanut	Thailand; Sutida Nakcharoensri; Thitirat Sae-oung
Dual Knife Form	Pal Chhor Raksmy; Cambodia	Nguyễn Thị Ngọc Trâm; Vietnam	Manik Trisna Dewi Wetan; Indonesia
Dual Knife Form	Pal Chhor Raksmy; Cambodia	Nguyễn Thị Ngọc Trâm; Vietnam	Khine War Phoo; Myanmar
Pair Sword Form	Cambodia; Pov Sokha; Soeur Chanleakhena	Vietnam; Lâm Thị Lời; Nguyễn Thị Tuyết Mai	Myanmar; Eain Dray Phoo; Su Wati Htay
Pair Sword Form	Cambodia; Pov Sokha; Soeur Chanleakhena	Vietnam; Lâm Thị Lời; Nguyễn Thị Tuyết Mai	Indonesia; Manik Trisna Dewi Wetan; Ni Made Purnami
Aspect Broadsword Single Form	Pal Chhor Raksmy; Cambodia	Eain Dray Phoo; Myanmar	Janah Jaje Ochea Lavadoh; Philippines
Aspect Broadsword Single Form	Pal Chhor Raksmy; Cambodia	Eain Dray Phoo; Myanmar	Ni Made Ayu Ratih Daneswari; Indonesia
Cross Form	Sutida Nakcharoensri; Thailand	Em Chankanika; Cambodia	Phouthida Phimnasone; Laos
Cross Form	Sutida Nakcharoensri; Thailand	Em Chankanika; Cambodia	Myint Sandi Kyaw; Myanmar
Dragon-tiger Form	Manik Trisna Dewi Wetan; Indonesia	Em Chankanika; Cambodia	Kanyarat Bampenthan; Thailand
Dragon-tiger Form	Manik Trisna Dewi Wetan; Indonesia	Em Chankanika; Cambodia	Khaing Zhar Htun; Myanmar
Self-defence Form	Nguyễn Thị Hoài Nương; Vietnam	Putu Wahana Maha Yoni; Indonesia	Chit No De Saung; Myanmar
Self-defence Form	Nguyễn Thị Hoài Nương; Vietnam	Putu Wahana Maha Yoni; Indonesia	Pal Chhor Raksmy; Cambodia
Ying-yang Sword Form	Manik Trisna Dewi Wetan; Indonesia	Pov Sokha; Cambodia	May Han Ni Aung Lwin; Myanmar
Ying-yang Sword Form	Manik Trisna Dewi Wetan; Indonesia	Pov Sokha; Cambodia	Thitirat Sae-Oung; Thailand
Ying-yang Sword Form 4x	Cambodia; Pov Sokha; Pal Chhorraksmy; Soeur Chanleakhena; Sok Nidanut; Sok Sophy	Vietnam; Hàng Thị Diễm My; Huỳnh Thị Diệu Thảo; Mai Thị Kim Thùy; Nguyễn Thị Hoài Nương; Lâm Thị Lời	Myanmar; Chit No De Saung; Myint Sandi Kyaw; Phyo Ei Kyaw; Su Wati Htay
Ying-yang Sword Form 4x	Cambodia; Pov Sokha; Pal Chhorraksmy; Soeur Chanleakhena; Sok Nidanut; Sok Sophy	Vietnam; Hàng Thị Diễm My; Huỳnh Thị Diệu Thảo; Mai Thị Kim Thùy; Nguyễn Thị Hoài Nương; Lâm Thị Lời	Indonesia; Kade Ayu Mas Sasvita Dewi; Ni Made Purnami; Ni Wayan Vina Puspita; Putu Wahana Maha Yoni; Ni Made Ayu Ratih Daneswari

==== Mixed ====
Event	Gold	Silver	Bronze
Multiple training	Vietnam; Đoàn Hoàng Thâm; Lâm Thị Thùy My; Lê Toàn Trung; Mai Thị Kim Thùy; Lâm Trí Linh	Cambodia; Chen Bunlong; Met Sopheaktra; Pal Chhorraksmy; Prak Sovanny; Rith Vannary	Indonesia; Efrie Surya Perdana; I Gusti Agung Ngurah Suardyana; I Wayan Wisma Pratama Putra; Kade Ayu Mas Sasvita Dewi; Kadek Dwi Dharmadi
Multiple training	Vietnam; Đoàn Hoàng Thâm; Lâm Thị Thùy My; Lê Toàn Trung; Mai Thị Kim Thùy; Lâm Trí Linh	Cambodia; Chen Bunlong; Met Sopheaktra; Pal Chhorraksmy; Prak Sovanny; Rith Vannary	Thailand; Dahalan Pohdingsamu; Phumin Sawatsai; Phupakorn Wongthanachet; Thitirat Sae-oung; Anupak Phetpoon
Basic self-defence	Cambodia; Khorn Chansopheakneath; Met Sopheaktra; Pal Chhorraksmy; Pov Sokha; Prak Sovanny; San Socheat	Vietnam; Lê Đức Duy; Nguyễn Hoàng Dũ; Huỳnh Khắc Nguyên; Nguyễn Thị Hoài Nương; Mai Thị Kim Thùy; Lâm Thị Lời	Myanmar; Hein Htet Aung; Khaing Zar Htun; Kyaw Thu Soe Aung; Nay Lin Htet; Phyo Ei Kyaw; Thidar Min
Basic self-defence	Cambodia; Khorn Chansopheakneath; Met Sopheaktra; Pal Chhorraksmy; Pov Sokha; Prak Sovanny; San Socheat	Vietnam; Lê Đức Duy; Nguyễn Hoàng Dũ; Huỳnh Khắc Nguyên; Nguyễn Thị Hoài Nương; Mai Thị Kim Thùy; Lâm Thị Lời	Indonesia; I Kadek Mogi Bahana Lenge; I Made Khrisna Dwipayana; I Wayan Purbawa; Kade Ayu Mas Sasvita Dewi; Ni Wayan Vina Puspita; Putu Wahana Maha Yoni
