= Karate at the 2023 SEA Games =

- Venue: Changvar Convention Centre
- Location: Phnom Penh, Cambodia
- Dates: 6–8 May 2023

Karate competitions at the 2023 SEA Games took place at Hall A, Changvar Convention Centre in Phnom Penh. Medals were awarded in 17 events in two categories, Kata and Kumite.

== Medal table ==
* Host nation (Cambodia)

Rank	Nation	Gold	Silver	Bronze	Total
1	Vietnam	6	1	6	13
2	Malaysia	4	2	4	10
3	Philippines	2	6	1	9
4	Indonesia	2	4	7	13
5	Thailand	2	1	5	8
6	Cambodia*	1	3	6	10
7	Laos	0	0	2	2
7	Timor-Leste	0	0	2	2
9	Brunei	0	0	1	1
Totals (9 entries)		17	17	34	68

== Medalists ==
=== Kata ===
Event	Gold	Silver	Bronze
Men's individual	Ahmad Zigi Zaresta Yuda; Indonesia	Muhammad Aiqal Asmadie; Malaysia	John Enrico Vasquez; Philippines
Men's individual	Ahmad Zigi Zaresta Yuda; Indonesia	Muhammad Aiqal Asmadie; Malaysia	Phạm Minh Đức; Vietnam
Women's individual	Sakura Alforte; Philippines	Nguyễn Thị Phương; Vietnam	Krisda Putri Aprilia; Indonesia
Women's individual	Sakura Alforte; Philippines	Nguyễn Thị Phương; Vietnam	Monsicha Sakulrattanatara; Thailand
Men's team	Vietnam; Lê Hồng Phúc; Phạm Minh Đức; Giang Việt Anh	Indonesia; Albiadi; Andi Tomy Aditya Mardana; Andi Dasril Dwi Dharmawan	Cambodia; Theng Kimchhea; Chheng Chandararattanak; Heng Ho
Men's team	Vietnam; Lê Hồng Phúc; Phạm Minh Đức; Giang Việt Anh	Indonesia; Albiadi; Andi Tomy Aditya Mardana; Andi Dasril Dwi Dharmawan	Thailand; Phanudet Khananpao; Phatchara Yantapanich; Inkawat Vichailakana
Women's team	Vietnam; Nguyễn Thị Phương; Lưu Thị Thu Uyên; Nguyễn Ngọc Trâm	Indonesia; Anugerah Nurul Lucky; Dian Monika Nababan; Emilia Sri Hanandyta	Malaysia; Lovelly Anne Robberth; Naccy Nelly Evvaferra; Niathalia Sherawinnie
Women's team	Vietnam; Nguyễn Thị Phương; Lưu Thị Thu Uyên; Nguyễn Ngọc Trâm	Indonesia; Anugerah Nurul Lucky; Dian Monika Nababan; Emilia Sri Hanandyta	Cambodia; Oun Sreyda; Puthea Sreynuch; Rith Kimleang; That Chhenghorng

=== Kumite ===
==== Men ====
Event	Gold	Silver	Bronze
−55 kg	Prem Kumar Selvam; Malaysia	Chanpet Setthapong; Thailand	Muhammad Harith Dahlan; Brunei
−55 kg	Prem Kumar Selvam; Malaysia	Chanpet Setthapong; Thailand	Trần Văn Vũ; Vietnam
−60 kg	Sureeya Sankar Hari Sankar; Malaysia	Ari Saputra; Indonesia	Ly Kouyhav; Cambodia
−60 kg	Sureeya Sankar Hari Sankar; Malaysia	Ari Saputra; Indonesia	Chu Văn Đức; Vietnam
−67 kg	Virak Bouth Chrun; Cambodia	John Matthew Manantan; Philippines	Tebing Hutapea; Indonesia
−67 kg	Virak Bouth Chrun; Cambodia	John Matthew Manantan; Philippines	Deonisio Fernandes; Timor-Leste
−75 kg	Sharmendran Raghonathan; Malaysia	Sot Phanith; Cambodia	Ignatius Joshua Kandou; Indonesia
−75 kg	Sharmendran Raghonathan; Malaysia	Sot Phanith; Cambodia	Jacob Manuel; Timor-Leste
−84 kg	Sandi Firmansyah; Indonesia	Ivan Christopher Agustin; Philippines	Muhd Arif Afifuddin Ab Malik; Malaysia
−84 kg	Sandi Firmansyah; Indonesia	Ivan Christopher Agustin; Philippines	Teerapat Kanabkaew; Thailand
+84 kg	Teerawat Kangtong; Thailand	Peng Sakkada; Cambodia	Vatthana Xayasan; Laos
+84 kg	Teerawat Kangtong; Thailand	Peng Sakkada; Cambodia	Trần Lê Tấn Đạt; Vietnam
Team	Vietnam; Chu Văn Đức; Đỗ Mạnh Hùng; Ðỗ Thành Nhân; Lò Văn Biển; Nguyễn Viết Ngọc Hiệp; Trần Lê Tấn Đạt; Võ Văn Hiền	Malaysia; Geerijaieswaran Pillai Sivanesan; Kathish S. Gnanasekaran; Kueggen Vijaya Kumar; Muhd Arif Afifuddin Ab Malik; Prem Kumar Selvam; Sharmendran Raghonathan; Sureeya Sankar Hari Sankar	Cambodia; Bin Mengly; Chheav Reaksa; Ly Kouyhav; Ngoun Sokkrayleng; Peng Sakkada; Sot Phanith; Sreang Virak
Team	Vietnam; Chu Văn Đức; Đỗ Mạnh Hùng; Ðỗ Thành Nhân; Lò Văn Biển; Nguyễn Viết Ngọc Hiệp; Trần Lê Tấn Đạt; Võ Văn Hiền	Malaysia; Geerijaieswaran Pillai Sivanesan; Kathish S. Gnanasekaran; Kueggen Vijaya Kumar; Muhd Arif Afifuddin Ab Malik; Prem Kumar Selvam; Sharmendran Raghonathan; Sureeya Sankar Hari Sankar	Indonesia; Ari Saputra; Faisal Halomoan Siahaan; Huggies Yustisio; Ignatius Joshua Kandou; Muhammad Tegar Januar; Sandi Firmansyah; Tebing Hutapea

==== Women ====
Event	Gold	Silver	Bronze
−50 kg	Shahmalarani Chandran; Malaysia	Junna Tsukii; Philippines	Nguyễn Thị Thu; Vietnam
−50 kg	Shahmalarani Chandran; Malaysia	Junna Tsukii; Philippines	Chanyanut Chippensuk; Thailand
−55 kg	Hoàng Thị Mỹ Tâm; Vietnam	Cok Istri Agung Sanistyarani; Indonesia	Sirikamonnate Chokprasertgul; Thailand
−55 kg	Hoàng Thị Mỹ Tâm; Vietnam	Cok Istri Agung Sanistyarani; Indonesia	Madhuri Poovanesan; Malaysia
−61 kg	Jamie Lim; Philippines	Vann Chakriya; Cambodia	Nguyễn Thị Ngoan; Vietnam
−61 kg	Jamie Lim; Philippines	Vann Chakriya; Cambodia	Vilatda Boupphavanh; Laos
−68 kg	Đinh Thị Hương; Vietnam	Remon Villanueva Misu; Philippines	Han Sara; Cambodia
−68 kg	Đinh Thị Hương; Vietnam	Remon Villanueva Misu; Philippines	Ceyco Georgia Zefanya; Indonesia
+68 kg	Kewalin Songklin; Thailand	Arianne Isabel Yu Brito; Philippines	Niza San; Cambodia
+68 kg	Kewalin Songklin; Thailand	Arianne Isabel Yu Brito; Philippines	Dessyinta Rakawuni Banurea; Indonesia
Team	Vietnam; Đinh Thị Hương; Hoàng Thị Mỹ Tâm; Nguyễn Thị Ngoan; Trương Thị Thương	Philippines; Arianne Isabel Yu Brito; Jamie Lim; Remon Villanueva Misu; Junna Tsukii	Indonesia; Ceyco Georgia Zefanya; Cok Istri Agung Sanistyarani; Dessyinta Rakawuni Banurea; Devina Dea
Team	Vietnam; Đinh Thị Hương; Hoàng Thị Mỹ Tâm; Nguyễn Thị Ngoan; Trương Thị Thương	Philippines; Arianne Isabel Yu Brito; Jamie Lim; Remon Villanueva Misu; Junna Tsukii	Malaysia; Madhuri Poovanesan; Shahmalarani Chandran; Shree Sharmini Segaran; Siti Nur Azwani Nor Azli
