= Pencak silat at the 2023 SEA Games =

- Venue: Chroy Changvar Convention Centre Hall E
- Location: Phnom Penh, Cambodia
- Dates: 6–10 May

The Pencak silat held at 2023 SEA Games was contested from 6 to 10 May 2023 at Chroy Changvar Convention Centre Hall E, Phnom Penh. Pencak silat itself is a traditional martial art originating from Indonesia.

== Medal table ==
* Host nation (Cambodia)

Rank	Nation	Gold	Silver	Bronze	Total
1	Indonesia	9	6	1	16
2	Malaysia	4	5	4	13
3	Vietnam	4	1	9	14
4	Singapore	2	3	5	10
4	Thailand	2	3	5	10
6	Cambodia*	2	0	10	12
7	Philippines	0	2	8	10
8	Brunei	0	1	1	2
9	Laos	0	0	1	1
Totals (9 entries)		23	21	44	88

== Medalist ==
=== Seni (artistic) ===
Event	Gold	Silver	Bronze
Men's single	Soem Sokdevid; Cambodia	Muhammad Khairul Shaddad Ardi; Malaysia	Phạm Hải Tiến; Vietnam
Men's single	Soem Sokdevid; Cambodia	Muhammad Khairul Shaddad Ardi; Malaysia	Muhammad Iqbal bin Abdul Rahman; Singapore
Women's single	Puspa Arumsari; Indonesia	Nur Syafiqah binti Hamzah; Malaysia	Vương Thị Bình; Vietnam
Women's single	Puspa Arumsari; Indonesia	Nur Syafiqah binti Hamzah; Malaysia	Siti Nazurah binte Mohd Yussof; Singapore
Men's double	Malaysia; Muhd Danial Azray Hoorazizan; Muhd Danial Azrol Hoorazizan	Philippines; Alfau Jan Esmael Abad; Almohaidib Esmael Abad	Cambodia; Heng Chandy; Loch Oudom
Men's double	Malaysia; Muhd Danial Azray Hoorazizan; Muhd Danial Azrol Hoorazizan	Philippines; Alfau Jan Esmael Abad; Almohaidib Esmael Abad	Vietnam; Võ Bình Phước; Đào Đức Hùng
Women's double	Thailand; Orawan Choosuwan; Saowanee Chanthamunee	Indonesia; Ririn Rinasih; Riska Hermawan	Cambodia; Phoen Sreyneang; Son Sothea
Women's double	Thailand; Orawan Choosuwan; Saowanee Chanthamunee	Indonesia; Ririn Rinasih; Riska Hermawan	Malaysia; Nur Sarafana Hikma Jailani; Nur Shahida Mohd Sharim
Men's team	Indonesia; Anggi Faisal Mubarok; Asep Yuldan Sani; Rano Slamet Nugraha	Thailand; Abdulkarim Koolee; Salwa Cheha; Sobri Cheni	Brunei; Mohd Hazim Ramlee; Muhd Hazim Aqwa Md Iman Safwan; Muhd Ali Saifullah Abdullah Md Suhaimi
Men's team	Indonesia; Anggi Faisal Mubarok; Asep Yuldan Sani; Rano Slamet Nugraha	Thailand; Abdulkarim Koolee; Salwa Cheha; Sobri Cheni	Cambodia; Chea Sarith; Chhuoy Silath; Nok Sokea
Women's team	Singapore; Amirah binte Sahrin; Iffah Batrisyia binte Noh; Nur Ashikin binte Zulkifli	Brunei; Anisah Najihah; Norleyermah binti Haji Raya; Nur Wasiqah Aziemah	Philippines; Franchette Anne Tolentino Elman; Jessapitulah Dela Crus; Shara Julia Jizmundo
Women's team	Singapore; Amirah binte Sahrin; Iffah Batrisyia binte Noh; Nur Ashikin binte Zulkifli	Brunei; Anisah Najihah; Norleyermah binti Haji Raya; Nur Wasiqah Aziemah	Cambodia; By Siv Chheng; Chun Reaksa; Ham Dalin

=== Tanding (match) ===
==== Men ====
Event	Gold	Silver	Bronze
Class U45 (–45 kg)	Non Sromoachkroham; Cambodia	Bayu Lesmana; Indonesia	Muhammad Khairul Shaddad Ardi; Malaysia
Class U45 (–45 kg)	Non Sromoachkroham; Cambodia	Bayu Lesmana; Indonesia	Dhani Andika Bin Razali; Singapore
Class A (45–50kg)	Khoirudin Mustakim; Indonesia	Dines Dasig Dumaan; Philippines	Vorn Soksreymompisal; Cambodia
Class A (45–50kg)	Khoirudin Mustakim; Indonesia	Dines Dasig Dumaan; Philippines	Bùi Văn Thống; Vietnam
Class B (50–55kg)	Muhammad Zaki Zikrillah Prasong; Indonesia	Sarayut Srakaew; Thailand	Chhim Rachhat; Cambodia
Class B (50–55kg)	Muhammad Zaki Zikrillah Prasong; Indonesia	Sarayut Srakaew; Thailand	Nguyễn Thế Vũ; Vietnam
Class C (55–60kg)	Phiraphon Mitthasan; Thailand	Muhamad Yachser Arafa; Indonesia	Vũ Văn Kiên; Vietnam
Class C (55–60kg)	Phiraphon Mitthasan; Thailand	Muhamad Yachser Arafa; Indonesia	Gregmart Nova Benitez; Philippines
Class D (60–65kg)	Muhammad Izzul Irfan Bin Marzuki; Malaysia	Kadek Andrey Nova Prayada; Indonesia	Denmark Bangoy Abdurasad; Philippines
Class D (60–65kg)	Muhammad Izzul Irfan Bin Marzuki; Malaysia	Kadek Andrey Nova Prayada; Indonesia	At Chandy; Cambodia
Class E (65–70kg)	Tito Hendra Septia Kurnia; Indonesia	Pornteb Pholkaew; Thailand	Ian Christopher Canonigo Calo; Philippines
Class E (65–70kg)	Tito Hendra Septia Kurnia; Indonesia	Pornteb Pholkaew; Thailand	Phạm Tuấn Anh; Vietnam
Class F (70–75kg)	Iqbal Candra Pratama; Indonesia	Mohd Shahrul Zeckry Sulaiman; Malaysia	Vũ Đức Hùng; Vietnam
Class F (70–75kg)	Iqbal Candra Pratama; Indonesia	Mohd Shahrul Zeckry Sulaiman; Malaysia	Aekarat Maehchi; Thailand
Class G (75–80kg)	Nguyễn Tấn Sang; Vietnam	Sheik Ferdous Bin Sheik Alau'ddin; Singapore	Afiq Aniq Fazly; Malaysia
Class G (75–80kg)	Nguyễn Tấn Sang; Vietnam	Sheik Ferdous Bin Sheik Alau'ddin; Singapore	Suthat Bunchit; Thailand
Class H (80–85kg)	Nguyễn Duy Tuyến; Vietnam	Muhammad Nurshahfareeq Bin Shahrudin; Singapore	Pimpirat Tonkhieo; Thailand
Class H (80–85kg)	Nguyễn Duy Tuyến; Vietnam	Muhammad Nurshahfareeq Bin Shahrudin; Singapore	Joash Mariño Cantoria; Philippines
Class I (85–90kg)	Sheik Farhan Bin Sheik Alau'ddin; Singapore	Muhammad Robial Bin Sobri; Malaysia	Saranon Glompan; Thailand
Class I (85–90kg)	Sheik Farhan Bin Sheik Alau'ddin; Singapore	Muhammad Robial Bin Sobri; Malaysia	Ronaldo Neno; Indonesia

==== Women ====
Event	Gold	Silver	Bronze
Class U45 (–45kg)	Norsyakirah Muksin; Malaysia	Suci Wulandari; Indonesia	Đinh Thị Kim Tuyến; Vietnam
Class U45 (–45kg)	Norsyakirah Muksin; Malaysia	Suci Wulandari; Indonesia	Nur Tuhfah Izzah Binte Md Roslan; Singapore
Class A (45–50kg)	Nor Farah Mazlan; Malaysia	Nadhirah Binte Sahrin; Singapore	Firdao Duromae; Thailand
Class A (45–50kg)	Nor Farah Mazlan; Malaysia	Nadhirah Binte Sahrin; Singapore	Angeline Abordo Virina; Philippines
Class B (50–55kg)	Safira Dwi Meilani; Indonesia	no medal awarded	Nur Syazeera Hidayah Binti Idris; Malaysia
Class B (50–55kg)	Nguyễn Hoàng Hồng Ân; Vietnam	no medal awarded	Ladda Phongsa; Laos
Class C (55–60kg)	Jeni Elvis Kause; Indonesia	Nguyễn Thị Cẩm Nhi; Vietnam	Rogielyn Adan Parado; Philippines
Class C (55–60kg)	Jeni Elvis Kause; Indonesia	Nguyễn Thị Cẩm Nhi; Vietnam	Sotheara Chourn; Cambodia
Class D (60–65kg)	Atifa Fismawati; Indonesia	Siti Shazwana Binti Ajak; Malaysia	Angel-Ann Badajos Singh; Philippines
Class D (60–65kg)	Atifa Fismawati; Indonesia	Siti Shazwana Binti Ajak; Malaysia	Phyrom Moniroth; Cambodia
Class E (65–70kg)	Quàng Thị Thu Nghĩa; Vietnam	Nia Larasati; Indonesia	Vanita Kun; Cambodia
Class E (65–70kg)	Quàng Thị Thu Nghĩa; Vietnam	Nia Larasati; Indonesia	Nurul Suhaila; Singapore
