= Golf at the 2023 SEA Games =

- Venue: Garden City Golf Club
- Location: Phnom Penh, Cambodia
- Date: 8–13 May 2023

Golf competitions at the 2023 SEA Games took place at Garden City Golf Club in Phnom Penh, Cambodia from 8 to 13 May 2023.

== Medal table ==
* Host nation (Cambodia)

Rank	Nation	Gold	Silver	Bronze	Total
1	Thailand	2	1	0	3
2	Malaysia	1	1	2	4
3	Vietnam	1	1	1	3
4	Indonesia	0	1	1	2
Totals (4 entries)		4	4	4	12

== Medalists ==
Event	Gold	Silver	Bronze
Men's individual	Lê Khánh Hưng; Vietnam	Malcolm Ting Siong Hung; Malaysia	Nguyễn Anh Minh; Vietnam
Men's team	Thailand; Jiradech Chaowarat; Arsit Areephun; Ratchanon Chantananuwat	Vietnam; Lê Khánh Hưng; Nguyễn Anh Minh; Đoàn Uy	Indonesia; Amadeus Christian Susanto; Jonathan Xavier Hartono; Randy Arbenata Moh. Bintang; Rayhan Abdul Latief
Women's individual	Ng Jing Xuen; Malaysia	Eila Galitsky; Thailand	Foong Zi Yu; Malaysia
Women's team	Thailand; Navaporn Soontreeyapas; Eila Galitsky	Indonesia; Elaine Widjaja; Holly Victoria Halim	Malaysia; Foong Zi Yu; Geraldine Wong Xiao Xuan
