= Tennis at the 2023 SEA Games =

- Venue: Morodok Techo National Stadium
- Location: Phnom Penh, Cambodia
- Dates: 6–14 May

Tennis at 2023 SEA Games was contested from 6 to 14 May 2023 at Tennis Arena, Morodok Techo National Stadium. Seven events were featured for tennis namely: men's singles, women's singles, men's doubles, women's doubles, mixed doubles, men's team and women's team.

== Medal table ==
* Host nation (Cambodia)

Rank	Nation	Gold	Silver	Bronze	Total
1	Indonesia	4	2	3	9
2	Thailand	2	3	4	9
3	Philippines	1	0	0	1
4	Vietnam	0	2	3	5
5	Cambodia*	0	0	2	2
5	Malaysia	0	0	2	2
Totals (6 entries)		7	7	14	28

== Medalists ==
Event	Gold	Silver	Bronze
Men's singles	Muhammad Rifqi Fitriadi; Indonesia	Lý Hoàng Nam; Vietnam	Kasidit Samrej; Thailand
Men's singles	Muhammad Rifqi Fitriadi; Indonesia	Lý Hoàng Nam; Vietnam	Bun Kenny; Cambodia
Women's singles	Priska Madelyn Nugroho; Indonesia	Lanlana Tararudee; Thailand	Anchisa Chanta; Thailand
Women's singles	Priska Madelyn Nugroho; Indonesia	Lanlana Tararudee; Thailand	Savanna Lý-Nguyễn; Vietnam
Men's doubles	Philippines; Francis Alcantara; Ruben Gonzalez	Indonesia; Christopher Rungkat; Nathan Anthony Barki	Malaysia; Koay Hao Sheng; Mitsuki Leong Wei Kang
Men's doubles	Philippines; Francis Alcantara; Ruben Gonzalez	Indonesia; Christopher Rungkat; Nathan Anthony Barki	Vietnam; Nguyễn Đắc Tiến; Nguyễn Văn Phương
Women's doubles	Thailand; Luksika Kumkhum; Peangtarn Plipuech	Indonesia; Jessy Rompies; Aldila Sutjiadi	Thailand; Lanlana Tararudee; Punnin Kovapitukted
Women's doubles	Thailand; Luksika Kumkhum; Peangtarn Plipuech	Indonesia; Jessy Rompies; Aldila Sutjiadi	Indonesia; Beatrice Gumulya; Fitriana Sabrina
Mixed doubles	Indonesia; Christopher Rungkat; Aldila Sutjiadi	Thailand; Pruchya Isaro; Peangtarn Plipuech	Indonesia; David Agung Susanto; Beatrice Gumulya
Mixed doubles	Indonesia; Christopher Rungkat; Aldila Sutjiadi	Thailand; Pruchya Isaro; Peangtarn Plipuech	Thailand; Thantub Suksumrarn; Luksika Kumkhum
Men's team	Thailand; Yuttana Charoenphon; Kasidit Samrej; Pruchya Isaro; Thantub Suksumrarn	Vietnam; Lý Hoàng Nam; Nguyễn Văn Phương; Phạm Minh Tuấn; Trịnh Linh Giang	Malaysia; Christian Andre Liew Sheng; Koay Hao Sheng; Mitsuki Leong Wei Kang
Men's team	Thailand; Yuttana Charoenphon; Kasidit Samrej; Pruchya Isaro; Thantub Suksumrarn	Vietnam; Lý Hoàng Nam; Nguyễn Văn Phương; Phạm Minh Tuấn; Trịnh Linh Giang	Indonesia; Christopher Rungkat; David Agung Susanto; Muhammad Rifqi Fitriadi; Nathan Anthony Barki
Women's team	Indonesia; Aldila Sutjiadi; Beatrice Gumulya; Jessy Rompies; Priska Madelyn Nugroho	Thailand; Anchisa Chanta; Luksika Kumkhum; Peangtarn Plipuech; Lanlana Tararudee	Cambodia; Andrea Ka; Grace Krusling; Chenda Som
Women's team	Indonesia; Aldila Sutjiadi; Beatrice Gumulya; Jessy Rompies; Priska Madelyn Nugroho	Thailand; Anchisa Chanta; Luksika Kumkhum; Peangtarn Plipuech; Lanlana Tararudee	Vietnam; Savanna Lý-Nguyễn; Phạm Đình Quỳnh; Sĩ Bội Ngọc
