= Cycling at the 2023 SEA Games =

- Location: Siem Reap, Cambodia
- Dates: 6–13 May 2023

The cycling competition at the 2023 SEA Games took place in Siem Reap, Cambodia from 6 to 13 May 2023. The competition consisted of two events, road cycling and mountain biking. A total of nine medals were awarded. The road cycling events were held near Angkor Wat, UNESCO World Heritage Site. The mountain biking events were held at Kulen Mountain.

== Medal table ==
* Host nation (Cambodia)

Rank	Nation	Gold	Silver	Bronze	Total
1	Indonesia	5	2	1	8
2	Thailand	2	2	2	6
3	Malaysia	1	2	2	5
4	Vietnam	1	1	0	2
5	Philippines	0	1	3	4
6	Cambodia*	0	1	1	2
Totals (6 entries)		9	9	9	27

== Medal summary ==
=== Mountain biking ===
Event	Gold	Silver	Bronze
Men's cross country	Feri Yudoyono; Indonesia	Zaenal Fanani; Indonesia	Khim Menglong; Cambodia
Women's cross country	Sayu Bella Sukma Dewi; Indonesia	Nur Assyria Zainal Abidin; Malaysia	Yonthanan Phonkla; Thailand
Men's elimination	Methasit Boonsane; Thailand	Khim Menglong; Cambodia	Ihza Muhammad; Indonesia
Women's elimination	Dara Latifah; Indonesia	Ariana Evangelista; Philippines	Warinthorn Phetpraphan; Thailand
Mixed cross country relay	Indonesia; Sayu Bella Sukma Dewi; Dara Latifah; Zaenal Fanani; Feri Yudoyono	Thailand; Keerati Sukprasat; Phunsiri Sirimongkhon; Supuksorn Nuntana; Warinthorn Phetpraphan	Philippines; Ariana Evangelista; Edmhel John Flores; Jerico Cruz Rivera; Shagne Paula Yaoyao

=== Road race ===
Event	Gold	Silver	Bronze
Men's criterium	Terry Yudha Kusuma; Indonesia	Nur Amirul Fakhruddin Mazuki; Malaysia	Ronald Oranza; Philippines
Women's criterium	Jutatip Maneephan; Thailand	Nguyễn Thị Thật; Vietnam	Nur Aisyah Mohamad Zubir; Malaysia
Men's mass start	Nur Amirul Fakhruddin Mazuki; Malaysia	Aiman Cahyadi; Indonesia	Ronald Oranza; Philippines
Women's mass start	Nguyễn Thị Thật; Vietnam	Jutatip Maneephan; Thailand	Nur Aisyah Mohamad Zubir; Malaysia
