= Cambodia at the 2023 SEA Games =

Cambodia at the 2023 Southeast Asian Games
- IOC code: CAM
- NOC: National Olympic Committee of Cambodia

in Phnom Penh, Cambodia 5–17 May 2023
- Competitors: 896
- Flag bearer: Prom Samnang (Kun Khmer)
- Medals Ranked 4th: Gold 81 Silver 74 Bronze 127 Total 282

Southeast Asian Games appearances (overview)
- 1961; 1965; 1967–1981; 1983; 1985; 1987; 1989–1993; 1995; 1997; 1999; 2001; 2003; 2005; 2007; 2009; 2011; 2013; 2015; 2017; 2019; 2021; 2023; 2025; 2027; 2029

Cambodia participated in the 2023 SEA Games in Phnom Penh, as host from 5 to 17 May 2023. The Cambodian contingent consisted of 896 athletes.

Cambodia won its first gold medal on May 4, 2023, in the jujitsu men's duo event.

== Medal summary ==
=== Medal by sport ===
Medals by sport
Sport	1st place, gold medalist(s)	2nd place, silver medalist(s)	3rd place, bronze medalist(s)	Total	Rank
Kun Khmer	14	3	2	19	1
Vovinam	10	8	9	27	1
Kun bokator	8	7	3	18	1
Kickboxing	6	1	6	13	1
Wrestling	5	4	11	20	3
Sepak takraw	4	1	8	13	3
Jujitsu	3	5	1	9	2
Esports	3	1	1	5	2
Cricket	3	1	0	4	1
Arnis	2	6	4	12	2
Taekwondo	2	4	11	17	5
Soft tennis	2	2	4	8	2
Traditional boat race	2	2	4	8	4
Finswimming	2	1	4	7	4
Endurance race	2	1	0	3	2
Pencak silat	2	0	10	12	6
Billiards	2	0	4	6	4
Ouk chaktrang	1	4	1	6	3
Karate	1	3	6	10	6
Boxing	1	3	5	9	4
Wushu	1	3	3	7	6
Judo	1	2	5	8	3
Jet ski	1	1	2	4	2
Basketball	1	1	0	2	2
Badminton	1	0	0	1	3
Athletics	1	0	0	1	7
Pétanque	0	6	4	10	5
Gymnastics	0	1	3	4	4
Sailing	0	1	1	2	5
Cycling	0	1	1	2	6
Volleyball	0	1	0	1	4
Xiangqi	0	0	3	3	4
Tennis	0	0	2	2	5
Fencing	0	0	2	2	6
Obstacle race	0	0	1	1	4
Hockey	0	0	1	1	5
Weightlifting	0	0	1	1	6
Water polo	0	0	0	0	4
Dancesport	0	0	0	0	5
Diving	0	0	0	0	5
Floorball	0	0	0	0	5
Football	0	0	0	0	5
Golf	0	0	0	0	5
Table tennis	0	0	0	0	6
Swimming	0	0	0	0	7
Total	81	74	127	282	4

=== Medal by date ===
Reference: https://games.cambodia2023.com/#medalstanding

Medals by date
Day	Date	1st place, gold medalist(s)	2nd place, silver medalist(s)	3rd place, bronze medalist(s)	Total
4 May	5	4	0	9	
	5 May	Opening ceremony			
1	6 May	14	7	11	32
2	7 May	10	10	16	36
3	8 May	8	10	8	26
4	9 May	2	8	12	22
5	10 May	8	2	4	14
6	11 May	9	3	6	18
7	12 May	2	3	6	11
8	13 May	1	6	16	23
9	14 May	6	8	21	35
10	15 May	6	7	12	25
11	16 May	10	6	8	24
Total		81	74	127	282

=== Medal by gender ===
Reference: https://games.cambodia2023.com/#medalstanding

Medals by gender
Gender	1st place, gold medalist(s)	2nd place, silver medalist(s)	3rd place, bronze medalist(s)	Total	Percentage	Rank
Male	50	37	65	152	53.9%	4
Female	22	27	53	102	36.2%	6
Mixed	9	10	9	28	9.93%	3
Total	81	74	127	282	100%	4

== Medalists ==
Source: Official website

Medal	Name	Sport	Event	Date
Gold	Kim Titsovathanak	Kun bokator	Men's single bamboo shield form	4 May
Gold	Punleu Pichmorakoth	Kun bokator	Men's Single Bokator Spirit form	4 May
Gold	Yuos Shanchana	Kun bokator	Women's single bare hands form	4 May
Gold	Mao Leakena	Kun bokator	Women's single bokator spirit form	4 May
Gold	Kongmona Mithora; Touch Pikada	Jujitsu	Men's duo	4 May
Gold	Margot Garabedian	Endurance race	Women's individual aquathlon	6 May
Gold	Eh Virekkaamchhitphouthong	Vovinam	Men's 65 kg	6 May
Gold	Ly Boramy	Vovinam	Men's sun-moon broadsword form	6 May
Gold	Ly Boramy	Vovinam	Men's five-gate form	6 May
Gold	Im Langchhung; Ly Boramy; Men Sokvichheka; Meth Sary; Ny Tiza	Vovinam	Men's team ying-yang sword form 4x	6 May
Gold	Sok Limheng	Chess Ouk Chaktrang	Men's Singles 5-Minute	6 May
Gold	Sao Rithchesda	E-Sports	Attack Online 2 - Mixed Individual Event	6 May
Gold	Kongmona Mithora Touch Pikada	Jujitsu	Men's SHOW	6 May
Gold	Meng Hong Kan	Kun Khmer	Men's Kun Kru	6 May
Gold	Soeng Moeuy	Kun Khmer	Women's Kun Kru	6 May
Gold	Chhorn Sokhom; Cheat Khemrin; Sen Si E Oum Sansovin; Houth Sovoutha; Dem Tiya; Nom Hapchhun; Heng Rawut	Sepaktakraw And Chinlone	Men's Chinlone (Non-Repetition Primary)	6 May
Gold	Un Sreynich; Chhorn Sokhom; Cheat Khemrin; Orm Vuoch Leang; Nhoem Sreyneat; Pho Panha; Heng Rawut; Sen Si E	Sepaktakraw And Chinlone	Mixed Chinlone (Non-Repetition Primary)	6 May
Gold	Un Sreynich; Nuth Karona; Chea Raksmei; San Sophorn; Ly Srey Pich; Orm Vuoch Leang; Vann Socheata; Pho Panha	Sepaktakraw And Chinlone	Women's Chinlone (Non-Repetition Primary)	6 May
Gold	Sam Chankaby; Khun Chanroseka	Soft Tennis	Mixed Doubles	6 May
Gold	Dorsey Darrinray; Pridgett Sayeedalkabir; Peterson Brandon Jerome; Tep Chhorath	Basketball	Men's Team 3 x 3	7 May
Gold	Utkarsh Jain; Phon Bunthean; Te Senglong; Chanthoeun Rathanak; Pel Vannak; Uday Sing Hathinjar; Anish Rambabu; Lakshit Gupta; Salvin Stanly; Sahaj Chadha; Gulam Murtaza Chughtai; Luqman Butt; Etienne Beukes; Sharwan Godara; Ram Raushan Sharan	Cricket	Men's T50	7 May
Gold	Tea Sophana; Bol Visal; Sao Rithchesda; Sron Chanthoeun; Ouk Sotha; Mao Straboth; Chea Sokpich	E-Sports	Attack Online 2 - Mixed Team Event	7 May
Gold	Khan Jessa	Jujitsu	Women's Ne-Waza NOGI -52kg	7 May
Gold	Virak Bouth Chrun	Karate	Men's -67kg Kumite	7 May
Gold	Soem Sokdevid	Pencak Silat	Men's Artistic Tunggal (Single)	7 May
Gold	Heng Rawut; Nuth Karona; Chea Raksmei; Sorn Channem; Nuth Visal; San Sophorn; Sam Veasna; Pen Dinet	Sepaktakraw And Chinlone	Mixed Chinlone (Same Stroke)	7 May
Gold	John Mada; Kann Sophorn	Soft Tennis	Men's Individual Doubles	7 May
Gold	San Socheat; Meth Sopheaktra; Prak Sovanny; Pal Chhor Raksmy; Pov Sokha; Khorn Chansopheakneath; Chin Piseth	Vovinam	Mixed Team Basic Self-Defence Technique (Three Women And Three Men)	7 May
Gold	Pov Sokha; Sok Sophy; Pal Chhor Raksmy; Soeur Chanleakhena; Sok Nidanut	Vovinam	Women's Team Ying-Yang Sword Form 4x	7 May
Gold	Sruong Pheavy	Billiards Sport	Women's 3-Cushion Carom Singles	8 May
Gold	Nget Deb	Kun bokator	Men's Combat 55kg	8 May
Gold	Chet Chon	Kun bokator	Men's Combat 60kg	8 May
Gold	Ey Sam Oun	Kun bokator	Men's Single Phkak Form	8 May
Gold	Sivesien Sin	Kun bokator	Women's Single Phkak Form	8 May
Gold	Margot Garabedian	Triathlon / Duathlon / Aquathlon	Women's Individual Triathlon	8 May
Gold	Sean Chanhout	Vovinam	Men's Four-Element Staff Form	8 May
Gold	Pal Chhor Raksmy	Vovinam	Women's Aspect Broadsword Single Form	8 May
Gold	Pal Chhor Raksmy	Vovinam	Women's Dual Knife Form	9 May
Gold	Pov Sokha; Soeur Chanleakhena	Vovinam	Women's Pair Sword Form	9 May
Silver	Pech Ponler	Kun bokator	Men's single bare hands form	4 May
Silver	Heng Seavheang; Tim Sovanlina	Jujitsu	Women's show	4 May
Silver	Jessa Khan	Jujitsu	Women's ne-waza gi 52 kg	4 May
Silver	Puth Chanchhorvy	Kun bokator	Women's single bamboo shield form	4 May
Silver	Em Chankanika	Vovinam	Women's dragon-tiger form	6 May
Bronze	Chin Piseth; Chren Bunlong; Kao Vichetrach; Meth Sopheaktra; San Socheat	Vovinam	Men's team leg 4x	6 May
Bronze	Pov Sokha; Sok Nidanut	Vovinam	Women's dual form	6 May
Bronze	Pech Chomno	Vovinam	Women's 55 kg	6 May

== Athletics ==
=== Track & road events ===
==== Men ====
Athlete	Event	Heats		Final	
Athlete	Event	Time	Rank	Time	Rank
Noeb Chanyourong	100 m	00:10.86	5th	Did not advance	
Pen Sokong	100 m	00:10.80	1st	00:10.80	7th
Pen Sokong	200 m	00:21.98	7th	Did not advance	
Tort Salin	200 m	00:22.68	6th	Did not advance	
Yatpitou Chantivea	400 m	00:49.76	6th	Did not advance	
Lai Piseth	400 m	00:58.45	6th	Did not advance	
Chhun Bunthorn	800 m	01:52.17	1st	01:52.91	1st place, gold medalist(s)
Yun Virak	800 m	01:58.94	6th	Did not advance	
Yun Virak	1,500 m	—N/a		04:02.16	5th
Phat Sophut	1,500 m	—N/a		04:12.38	12th
Klaing Babunnara	5,000 m	—N/a		17:36.15	16th
Yan Vibol	5,000 m	—N/a		15:09.65	8th
Yan Vibol	10,000 m	—N/a		32:53.07	7th
Ouk Rohit	10,000 m	—N/a		34:44.19	12th
Phan Phannchi	110 m hurdles	—N/a		00:17.01	7th
Phan Phannchi	400 m hurdles	01:01.49	6th	Did not advance	
Phan Sokheng	400 m hurdles	01:01.63	6th	Did not advance	
Ri Udom	3,000 m steeplechase	—N/a		10:36.06	8th
Som Pisey	3,000 m steeplechase	—N/a		10:42.85	9th
Khem Nhork; Noeb Chanyourong; Pen Sokong; Phan Phannchi	4x100 m relay	—N/a		DNF	
Sat Nanvirakyuth	20 km walk	—N/a		02:29:17	8th
Vann Pheara	Marathon	—N/a		02:41:26	5th
Yang Piseth	Marathon	—N/a		DNF	

==== Women ====
Athlete	Event	Heats		Final	
Athlete	Event	Time	Rank	Time	Rank
Sang Lida	100 m	00:12.39	6th	Did not advance	
Duong Sreypheap	100 m	00:12.71	7th	Did not advance	
Duong Sreypheap	200 m	00:25.96	6th	Did not advance	
Sang Lida	200 m	00:25.73	5th	Did not advance	
Ben Seyha	400 m	—N/a		DNS	
Kan Sreyroth	800 m	—N/a		02:24.46	10th
Bou Samnang	1,500 m	—N/a		DNS	
Bou Samnang	5,000 m	—N/a		22:54.22	11th
Run Romdul	5,000 m	—N/a		21:27:08	10th
Ling Rachna	10,000 m	—N/a		41:11.57	12th
Jun Sophea	10,000 m	—N/a		DNS	
Jun Sophea	100 m hurdles	DNS		Did not advance	
Kan Sreyroth; Doung Sreypheap; Ben Seyha; Pok Pisey	4x100 m relay	—N/a		00:49.50	6th
Eng Muy Ngim	Marathon	—N/a		04:00:17	9th
Jun Sophea	Marathon	—N/a		DNS	

=== Field events ===
==== Men ====
Athlete	Event	Final	
Athlete	Event	Distance (m)	Rank
Sin Samedy	Discus throw	37.58	8th
Pang Chamroeun Vithiear	Hammer throw	51.82	6th
Touch Phoeurn	Javelin throw	47.8	8th
Yan Chan	Long jump	1.95	8th
Khem Nhork	Long jump	1.85	9th
Roem Chanrotha	Long jump	6.83	10th
Hoeun Chav	Long jump	1.85	11th
Hoeun Chav	Triple jump	NM	
Roem Chanrotha	Triple jump	13.25	10th
Sim Samedy	Shot put	14.65	8th
Pang Chamroeun Vithiear	Shot put	13.19	9th

==== Women ====
Athlete	Event	Final	
Athlete	Event	Distance (m)	Rank
Phon Sovannara	Discus throw	29.75	5th
Pok Pisey	Long jump	4.76	8th
Sun Soklim	Long jump	NM	

== Badminton ==
=== Men's event ===
Athlete	Event	First Round	Second Round	Quarterfinals	Semifinals	Final	
Athlete	Event	Opposition Score	Opposition Score	Opposition Score	Opposition Score	Opposition Score	Rank
Sok Rikreay	Singles	Jewel Albo (PHI); L 0–2 (18–21, 8–21)	Did not advance				
Vath Vannthoun	Singles	Bye	Duc Phat Le (VIE); L 0–2 (10–21, 7–21)	Did not advance			
Reach Sophanith; Sorn Liza	Doubles	—N/a	Beh Chun Meng; Goh Boon Zhe (MAS); L 0–2 (3–21, 11–21)	Did not advance			
Heng Mengleap; Yam Somnang	Doubles	—N/a	Johann Prajogo; Joo Jie Nge (SGP); L 0–2 (10–21, 11–21)	Did not advance			
Reach Sophanith; Sorn Liza; Heng Mengleap; Yam Somnang; Sok Rikreay; Vath Vannthoun; Heng Mengly	Team	—N/a		Thailand; L 0–3	Did not advance		

=== Women's event ===
Athlete	Event	First Round	Quarterfinals	Semifinals	Final	
Athlete	Event	Opposition Score	Opposition Score	Opposition Score	Opposition Score	Rank
Phon Chenda	Singles	Komang Ayu Cahya Dewi (INA); L 0–2 (3–21, 5–21)	Did not advance			
Heang Leakhena	Singles	Nur Hamid Khan (SGP); L 0–2 (5–21, 1–21)	Did not advance			
Bun Srey Hong; Lim Kimloung	Doubles	Airah Albo; Thea Pomar (PHI); L 0–2 (5–21, 9–21)	Did not advance			
Chheng Huy; Teav Seavty	Doubles	Xiao En Heng; Yi Ting Lai (SGP); L 1–2 (21–17, 19–21, 8–21)	Did not advance			
Phon Chenda; Chheng Huy; Teav Seavty; Heang Leakhena; Lim Kimloung; Bun Srey Hong	Team	—N/a	Indonesia; L 0–3	Did not advance		

=== Mixed's event ===
Athlete	Event	First Round	Quarterfinals	Semifinals	Final	
Athlete	Event	Opposition Score	Opposition Score	Opposition Score	Opposition Score	Rank
Lim Kimloung; Vath Vannthoun	Doubles	Zidane Gusmao de Jesus; Zoraida Gusmao de Jesus (TLS); W 2–0 (21–6, 21–8)	Cheng Yu Sin; Yap Roy King (MAS); L 0–2 (5–21, 3–21)	Did not advance		
Bun Srey Hong; Heng Mengleap	Doubles	Choong Hon Jian; Yap Ling (MAS); L 0–2 (9–21, 8–21)	Did not advance			
Lim Kimloung; Vath Vannthoun; Teav Seavty; Yam Somnang; Chheng Huy; Meng Chourng; Sok Rikreay; Lav Chea; Phon Chenda	Team	—N/a	Timor-Leste; W 3–0	Laos; W 3–2	Myanmar; W 3–2	1st place, gold medalist(s)

== Basketball ==
=== 3x3 Basketball ===
Team	Event	Group Stage				Semifinals	Final / BM	
Team	Event	Opposition Score	Opposition Score	Opposition Score	Rank	Opposition Score	Opposition Score	Rank
Dorsey Darrinray; Sayeed Pridgett; Brandon Jerome Peterson; Chhorath Tep	Men's	Thailand; W 21–18	Singapore; W 21–13	Malaysia; W 21–12	1	Vietnam; W 21–19	Philippines; W 20–15	1st place, gold medalist(s)
Dinkins Brittany; Huong Theamearodey; Reid Monique Marie; Simmons Meighansharee	Women's	Malaysia; W 22–10	Singapore; W 21–12	Indonesia; W 14–13	1	Philippines; L 20–21	Indonesia; L 15–21	4

=== 5x5 Basketball ===
Team	Event	Group Stage							Semifinals	Final / BM / CM	
Team	Event	Opposition Score	Opposition Score	Opposition Score	Opposition Score	Opposition Score	Opposition Score	Rank	Opposition Score	Opposition Score	Rank
Cambodia men's	Men's	Singapore; W 85–60	Philippines; W 79–68	Malaysia; W 104–90	—N/a			1st	Thailand; W 76–66	Philippines; L 69–80	2nd place, silver medalist(s)
Cambodia women's	Women's	Malaysia; L 101–107 (ET)	Philippines; L 54–114	Singapore; W 83–63	Indonesia; L 54–100	Vietnam; L 77–86	Thailand; L 81–108	6th	—N/a		

== Billiards ==
=== Carom ===
Athlete	Event	Round of 16	Quarterfinals	Semifinals	Final	
Athlete	Event	Opposition Score	Opposition Score	Opposition Score	Opposition Score	Rank
Puth Chandara	Men's 3-cushion carom singles	Bye	Duc Anh Chien Nguyen (VIE); L 0–1	Did not advance		
Woo Donghoon	Men's 3-cushion carom singles	Efren Reyes (PHI); W 1–0	Suriya Suwannasingh (THA); W 1–0	Tran Thanh Tu Nguyen (VIE); L 0–1	Did not advance	3rd place, bronze medalist(s)
Sruong Pheavy	Women's 1-cushion carom singles	—N/a	Vuthiphan Kongkaket (THA); W 1–0	Kien Tuong Phung (VIE); L 0–1	Did not advance	3rd place, bronze medalist(s)
Sruong Pheavy	Women's 3-cushion carom singles	—N/a	Chezka Luy Centeno (PHI); W 1–0	Kien Tuong Phung (VIE); W 1–0	Hoang Yen Nhi Nguyen (VIE); W 1–0	1st place, gold medalist(s)

=== Pool ===
Athlete	Event	Round of 32	Round of 16	Quarterfinals	Semifinals	Final	
Athlete	Event	Opposition Score	Opposition Score	Opposition Score	Opposition Score	Opposition Score	Rank
Peou Visal	Men's 9-ball pool singles	Preecha Boonmoung (THA); L 1–9	Did not advance				
Sorm Samnang	Men's 9-ball pool singles	Bye	Ahmad Taufiq Murni (BRU); L 3–9	Did not advance			
Sorm Samnang; Peou Visal	Men's 9-ball pool doubles	—N/a	Preecha Boonmoung; Sompol Saetang (THA); L 2–9	Did not advance			

=== Snooker ===
Athlete	Event	Round of 32	Round of 16	Quarterfinals	Semifinals	Final	
Athlete	Event	Opposition Score	Opposition Score	Opposition Score	Opposition Score	Opposition Score	Rank
Men's English billiard singles	Loem Chong Iev	—N/a	Thanh Binh Nguyen (VIE); L 0–3	Did not advance			
Men's English billiard singles	Oy Rany	—N/a	Trung Kien Nguyen (VIE); L 0–3	Did not advance			
Suon Chhay	Men's snooker singles	Ong Jia Jun (SGP); W 4–1	Lim Kok Leong (MAS); L 3–4	Did not advance			
Men Sophanith	Men's snooker singles	Jefrey Consigna Roda (PHI); W 4–2	Wattana Pu-Ob-Orm (THA); W 4–1	Siththideth Sakbieng (LAO); W 4–2	Thor Chuan Leong (MAS); L 2–4	Did not advance	3rd place, bronze medalist(s)
Men Sophanith; Suon Chhay	Men's snooker doubles	—N/a	Bye	Kritsanut Lertsattayathorn; Passakorn Suwannawat (THA); W 3–1	Nay Min Tun; Phone Myint Kyaw (MYA); W 3–2	Lim Kok Leong; Moh Keen Hoo (MAS); W 3–1	1st place, gold medalist(s)
Men Sophanith	Men's snooker 6-red singles	Bye	Hoai Nguyen Pham (VIE); L 2–5	Did not advance			
Thay Tech Hok	Men's snooker 6-red singles	Bye	Jongrak Boonrod (THA); W 5–1	Moh Keen Hoo (MAS); L 3–5	Did not advance		
Suon Chhay; Thay Tech Hok	Men's snooker 6-red doubles	—N/a		Alvin Ambatali Barbero; Jefrey Consigna Roda (PHI); W 4–3	Siththideth Sakbieng; Suriya Minaldvong (LAO); L 0–4	Did not advance	3rd place, bronze medalist(s)

== Boxing ==
=== Men ===
Athlete	Event	Preliminaries	Quarterfinals	Semifinals	Final	
Athlete	Event	Opposition Result	Opposition Result	Opposition Result	Opposition Result	Rank
Oat Vichith	48 kg	—N/a	Linh Phung Nguyen (VIE); L RSC	Did not advance		
Nov Sokty	51 kg	—N/a	Muhammed Abdul Ariffin (MAS); L RSC	Did not advance		
Sao Rangsey	54 kg	Carlo Paalam (PHI); L 0–5	Did not advance			
Vanna Liheang	57 kg	—N/a	Asri Udin (INA); L 0–5	Did not advance		
Touch Davit	60 kg	Bye	Thongninh Xayyaseng (LAO); W K.O.	Paul Celis Bascon (PHI); L K.O.	Did not advance	3rd place, bronze medalist(s)
Ven Ratha	63.5 kg	—N/a	James Melos Palicte (PHI); W 4–1	Farrand Papendang (INA); W 5–0	Somchay Wongsuwan (THA); L 1–4	2nd place, silver medalist(s)
Penh Vanthung	67 kg	—N/a	Jun Jie Velvan Tan (SGP); L 2–3	Did not advance		
Hun Kimheang	71 kg	—N/a	Sarohatua Lumbantobing (INA); L K.O.	Did not advance		
Nasredinov Anvar	80 kg	—N/a	—N/a	John Marvin (PHI); L 0–5	Did not advance	3rd place, bronze medalist(s)
Ong Phearak	86 kg	—N/a	—N/a	Jakkapong Yomkhot (THA); L 0–5	Did not advance	3rd place, bronze medalist(s)
Rajapov Abdulla	91 kg	—N/a	—N/a	Kitipat Prueksena (THA); W 5–0	Manh Cuong Nguyen (VIE); W 5–0	1st place, gold medalist(s)

=== Women ===
Athlete	Event	Quarterfinals	Semifinals	Final	
Athlete	Event	Opposition Result	Opposition Result	Opposition Result	Rank
Yeleubayeva Aishagul	54 Kg	Bye	Jutamas Jitpong (THA); L RSC	Did not advance	3rd place, bronze medalist(s)
Vy Sreysros	57 Kg	Bye	Nesthy Petecio (PHI); L 0–5	Did not advance	3rd place, bronze medalist(s)
Eh Priyanut Phouthong	63 Kg	Kay Thwe Nyein (MYA); L 0–5	Did not advance		
Vy Sreykhouch	69 Kg	—N/a	Panee Bounmeexai (LAO); W RSC	Janjaem Suwannapheng (THA); L RSC	2nd place, silver medalist(s)
Diday Dana	75 Kg	—N/a	Bye	Baison Manikon (THA); L RSC	2nd place, silver medalist(s)

== Chess ==
=== Ouk chaktrong ===
==== Men's event ====
Athlete	Event	Group Stage								Semifinals	Finals	Rank
Athlete	Event	Round 1	Round 2	Round 3	Round 4	Round 5	Round 6	Round 7	Rank	Semifinals	Finals	Rank
Athlete	Event	Opposition Score	Opposition Score	Opposition Score	Opposition Score	Opposition Score	Opposition Score	Opposition Score	Rank	Semifinals	Finals	Rank
Sok Limheng	Singles 5-Minute	Tupfah Khumnorkaew (THA); D 0.5–0.5	Heuangboutsy Inthanouphet (LAO); W 1–0	Quang Trung Nguyen (VIE); W 1–0	Naing Myo Lin (MYA); W 1–0	Edmundo Oseo Gatos (PHI); W 1–0	—N/a		1st	Nam Thang Hoang (VIE); W 1–0	Quang Trung Nguyen (VIE); W 1–0	1st place, gold medalist(s)
Nou Chanphanit	Singles 5-Minute	Meechai Kaewfainok (THA); D 0.5–0.5	Khonsavanh Senglek (LAO); W 1–0	Nam Thang Hoang (VIE); W 1–0	Aung Naing (MYA); W 1–0	Young Abundo Angelo (PHI); W 1–0	—N/a		1st	Quang Trung Nguyen (VIE); L 0–1	Did not advance	3rd place, bronze medalist(s)
Sam Kakada	Singles 60-Minute	Edmundo Oseo Gatos (PHI); W 1–0	Chi Yang (LAO); W 1–0	—N/a	Tinnakrit Arunnuntapanich (THA); W 1–0	Aung Niang (MYA); W 1–0	Tin Shan Wen (MAS); W 1–0	Thanh Ninh Vo (VIE); L 0–1	2nd	Khoa Bao (VIE); W 1–0	Boonsueb Saeheng (THA); L 0–1	2nd place, silver medalist(s)
Chheav Bora	Singles 60-Minute	Eugene Oliveros Torre (PHI); W 1–0	Heuangboutsy Inthanouphet (LAO); W 1–0	—N/a	Boonsueb Saeheng (THA); D 0.5–0.5	Wynn Zaw Htun (MYA); L 0–1	—N/a	Khoa Bao (VIE); L 0–1	4th	Did not advance		
Bou Bunmalyka / Yan Sok Leang	Doubles 60-Minute	Quang Trung Nguyen / Trong Binh Phan (VIE); W 1–0	Maung Maung Latt / Naing Myo Lin (MYA); W 1–0	—N/a	Jan Encarnacion Garcia / Paulo Sales Bersamina (PHI); W 1–0	Chi Yang / Lhonsavanh Senglek (LAO); W 1–0	Warot Kananub / Worathep Timsri (THA); L 0–1	Eshwant Anoop Singh / Nhavin Kumaresan (MAS); W 1–0	—N/a			2nd place, silver medalist(s)
Chea Sideth / Chheav Bora / Sok Limheng	Triples 60-Minute	Nay Oo Kyaw Tun / Nyein Chan / Wynn Zaw Htun (MYA); W 1–0	Nam Thang Hoang / Quoc Dung Tran / The Anh Duong (VIE); W 1–0	Darwin Rosales Laylo / Eugene Oliveros Torre / Rogelio Madrigal Antonio (PHI); W 1–0	Eshwant Anoop Singh / Nhavin Kumaresan / Tin Shan Wen (MAS); W 1–0	Warot Kananub / Wisuwat Teerapabpaisit / Worathep Timsri (THA); L 0–1	—N/a					2nd place, silver medalist(s)
Bin Kear Seng / Chea Sideth / Chhoy Vira / Meng Sereisambath	Quadruples 60-Minute	Boonsueb Saeheng / Ekkalak Ngammeesri / Tinnakrit Arunnuntapanich / Wisuwat Teerapabpaisit (THA); L 0–1	Darwin Laylo / Jan Garcia / Paulo Bersamina / Rogelio Antonio (PHI); W 1–0.5	Khoa Bao / Quoc Dung Tran / Thanh Ninh Vo / The Anh Duong (VIE); D 0.5–0.5	Maung Maung Latt / Nay Oo Kyaw Tun / Nyein Chan / Win Kyaing (MYA); W 1–0	—N/a						2nd place, silver medalist(s)

==== Women's event ====
Athlete	Event	Group Stage								Semifinals	Finals	Rank
Athlete	Event	Round 1	Round 2	Round 3	Round 4	Round 5	Round 6	Round 7	Rank	Semifinals	Finals	Rank
Athlete	Event	Opposition Score	Opposition Score	Opposition Score	Opposition Score	Opposition Score	Opposition Score	Opposition Score	Rank	Semifinals	Finals	Rank
Tep Sokratha	Singles 60-Minute	Houanchanmone Phonesavanh (LAO); W 1–0	Soe Moe Khaing (MYA); L 0–1	—N/a	Thi Hong Nhung Doan (VIE); L 0–1	Nur Faiqah Aminuddin (MAS); W 1–0	Sarocha Chuemsakul (THA); L 0–1	Shania Mae Garcia Mendoza (PHI); L 0–1	5th	Did not advance		
Pen Khemrareaksmey	Singles 60-Minute	Inthavong Maly (LAO); W 1–0	Su Su Hlaing (MYA); L 0–1	—N/a	Thi Dieu Uyen Vu (VIE); L 0–1	Chua Jia Tien (MAS); L 0–1	Sirikan Sukpancharoen (THA); L 0–1	Venice Vicente Marciso (PHI); L 0–1	6th	Did not advance		
Tep Sokratha / Pen Khemrareaksmey	Doubles 60-Minute	Houanchanmone Phonesavanh / Inthavong Maly (LAO); W 1.5–0.5	Nu Hong An Ton / Thanh Phuong Thao Pham (VIE); L 0–2	—N/a	Su Su Hlaing / Soe Moe Khaing (MYA); L 0–1	Nur Faiqah Aminuddin / Chua Jia Tien (MAS); W 1–0	Sarocha Chuemsakul / Sirikan Sukpancharoen (THA); L 0–1	Janelle Mae Frayna / Shania Mae Garcia Mendoza (PHI); L 0–1	6th	—N/a		

=== Xiangqi ===
Athlete	Event	Round Robin					
Athlete	Event	Round 1	Round 2	Round 3	Round 4	Round 5	Rank
Athlete	Event	Opposition Score	Opposition Score	Opposition Score	Opposition Score	Opposition Score	Rank
Yu Kuen Chiu	Men's standard single	Sim Yip How (MAS); D 1–1	Jackson Gomez Hong (PHI); D 1–1	Ly Huynh Lai (VIE); L 0–2	Radtai Lokutarapol (THA); W 2–0	Angelo Abundo Young (PHI); W 2–0	6th
Keung On Chan	Men's standard single	Jackson Gomez Hong (PHI); W 2–0	Sim Yip How (MAS); W 2–0	Thanh Bao Nguyen (VIE); D 1–1	Alvin Tusng Han Woo (SGP); L 0–2	Fang Sze Jie (MAS); D 1–1	3rd place, bronze medalist(s)
Heng Chamnan / Keung On Chan	Men's blitz team	Van Tien Hu / Tuan Hai Chu (VIE); L 0–2	Sim Yip How / Yeoh Thean Jern (MAS); L 0–2	Yi Hao Low / Alvin Tusng Han Woo (SGP); L 0–2	Tawee Danwirunhawanich / Pairoj Panichkul (THA); W 2–0	Garcia Jan Emmanuel / Bersamina Sales Paulo (PHI); W 2–0	3rd place, bronze medalist(s)
Heng Chamnan / Yu Kuen Chiu	Men's rapid team	Jackson Gomez Hong / Angelo Abundo Young (PHI); W 2–0	Tawee Danwirunhawanich / Pairoj Panichkul (THA); D 1–1	Yi Hao Low / Junyang Ng (SGP); W 2–0	Quang Nhat Nguyen / Cuu Tung Lan Dang (VIE); D 1–1	Tan Yu Huat / Yeoh Thean Jern (MAS); D 1–1	3rd place, bronze medalist(s)

== Esports ==
=== PC ===
Team	Event	Group Stage						Semifinal	Final	
Team	Event	Opposition Score	Opposition Score	Opposition Score	Opposition Score	Opposition Score	Rank	Opposition Score	Opposition Score	Rank
Sron Chanthoeun; Mao Straboth; Sao Rithchesda; Tea Sophana; Ouk Sotha; Chea Sokpich; Bol Visal	Attack Online 2	Thailand; W 3–0	Malaysia; W 3–0	—N/a			1st	—N/a	Malaysia; W 3–0	1st place, gold medalist(s)
Ounso Nimit; Nguon Lylyheng; Kong Sinet; Sou Vireak; Chhengchhin Chanmouyseng; Seak Lysopheng; Lay Chean Leang	Crossfire	Philippines; L 0–1	Laos; L 0–1	Indonesia; L 0–1 (Playoff)	—N/a		3rd	Did not advance		
Yet Yuthna; Lim Kimton; Soun Ratana; Thean Sovandy; Sun Kong Minh; Thay Channaro; Vonn Virakboth	Valorant	Malaysia; W 1–0	Vietnam; L 0–1	Singapore; L 0–1	Philippines; L 0–1	Indonesia; L 0–1	5th	Did not advance		

==== Attack Online 2 (Individual) ====
Athlete	Event	Pool Stage		Lower Bracket Stage		Final	
Athlete	Event	Scores	Rank	Scores	Rank	Scores	Rank
Sao Rithchesda	Individual	237	1st	—N/a		238	1st place, gold medalist(s)
Sron Chanthoeun	Individual	216	2nd	—N/a		237	2nd place, silver medalist(s)
Chea Sokpich	Individual	185	1st	—N/a		220	4th
Mao Straboth	Individual	200	3rd	—N/a		153	8th
Bol Visal	Individual	164	4th	186	4th	Did not advance	

=== Mobile ===
Team	Event	Group Stage				Semifinal	Final	
Team	Event	Opposition Score	Opposition Score	Opposition Score	Rank	Opposition Score	Opposition Score	Rank
Kong David; Leng Visal; Pheong Channarin; Pov Visal; Tou Sovandarapich; Chan Ankeak; David Nimeth	League of Legends: Wild Rift	Vietnam; L 0–3	Singapore; L 1–3	—N/a	4	Did not advance		
Khoun Amey; Kosal Piseth; Nhem Chandavan; Sok Roth; Ty Oudom; Cheang Piseth; Pich Sopheak	Mobile Legends: Bang Bang (men's)	Indonesia; W 1–0	Singapore; W 1–0	Myanmar; L 0–1	2	Malaysia; L 1–2	Myanmar; L 0–2	3rd place, bronze medalist(s)
Ath Vochora; Meas Rotheany; Oun Sreyneath; Tol Chantha; Vat Tithmarina; Chiv Nimeyrachana; Hea Hayna	Mobile Legends: Bang Bang (women's)	Indonesia; L 0–1	Philippines; L 0–1	—N/a	3	Did not advance		

==== PUBG Mobile (Individual) ====
PUBG Mobile (Individual) ranking
Player	Round 1	Round 2	Round 3	Round 4	Round 5	Round 6	Round 7	Round 8	WWCD	Total	Rank
Tra Chhnany	13	0	3	12	13	15	27	1	1	84	1st
Khot Khya	25	3	4	1	5	2	2	13	1	55	14th
Monny Chrnai	1	3	0	0	8	17	2	10	0	41	29th
Ly Saly	2	10	2	4	1	8	1	1	0	29	38th
Seng Sophea	2	3	2	3	0	10	7	0	0	27	42nd
Sok Somnang	1	4	1	2	2	1	0	1	0	12	57th

==== PUBG Mobile (Team) ====
PUBG Mobile (Team) ranking
Team Name	Player	Day 1	Day 2	Day 3	Total	Rank
Cambodia 2	Khot Khya; Ly Saly; Seng Sophea; Sorn Mengsean; Tek Daravann	41	20	51	112	6th
Cambodia 1	Hout Sen; Kong Ek; Monny Chrnai; Sok Somnang; Tra Chhany	34	41	23	102	7th

== Fencing ==
=== Men's ===
Athlete	Event	Pool Stage							Round of 16	Quarterfinals	Semifinals	Final / BM	
Athlete	Event	Opposition Score	Opposition Score	Opposition Score	Opposition Score	Opposition Score	Opposition Score	Rank	Opposition Score	Opposition Score	Opposition Score	Opposition Score	Rank
Sovoeun Saknuk	Individual épée	Nuraya Kadafie (INA); L 2–5	Issac Seet Kai Xuan (MAS); L 4–5	Nguyen Tien Nhat (VIE); L 1–5	Nattiphong Singkham (THA); L 1–5	Lee Eigran Ergina (PHI); L 3–5	Simon Renjie Lee (SGP); L 3–5	7th	Did not advance				
Vag Urminsky Frantisek Paul	Individual épée	Anggi Williansyah (INA); L 4–5	Koh I Jie (MAS); L 2–5	Phuoc Den Nguyen (VIE); L 2–5	Juengamnuaychai (THA); L 4–5	Noelito Garcia Jose (PHI); L 1–5	Jian Tong Si To (SGP); L 4–5	7th	Did not advance				
Vag Urminsky Frantisek Paul / Ra Nathan / Sovoeun Saknuk / Thong Tangchin	Team épée	—N/a								Jian Miguel Bautista / Rex Fernandez Delacruz / Lee Eigran Ergina / Noelito Jose (PHI); L 18–45	Did not advance		
Meas Kimleng	Individual foil	Sitsadipat Doungpatra (THA); L 0–5	Max Wei Kit Neo (SGP); L 0–5	Cheng Xing Han (MAS); L 1–5	Nathaniel Mangubat Perez (PHI); L 0–5	Van Hai Nguyen (VIE); L 0–5	—N/a	6th	Did not advance				
Khoeun Tima	Individual foil	Ratchanavi Deejing (THA); L 1–5	Samuel Elijah Robson (SGP); L 1–5	Hans Yoong Wei Shen (MAS); L 2–5	Samuel Lopez Tranquilan (PHI); L 2–5	Minh Quang Nguyen (VIE); L 0–5	—N/a	6th	Did not advance				
Meas Kimleng / Khoeun Tima / Phon Chheang Horng / Reun Makara	Team foil	—N/a								Zephaniah Ian Kiew / Max Neo / Samuel Elijah Robson / Lionel Wee (SGP); L 12–45	Did not advance		
Phirak Phearin	Individual sabre	Teh Zi Hao (MAS); L 3–5	Vu Thanh An (VIE); L 3–5	Wiriyatangsakul (THA); L 1–5	Ricky Dhisullimah (INA); L 1–5	Saysana Geofdroy (LAO); L 0–5	—N/a	6th	Did not advance				
Sorn Sinat	Individual sabre	Nicholas Wei-Hao Loo (SGP); L 1–5	Eunice Daniel Villanueva (PHI); L 1–5	Muhd Danish Bin Asahrin (BRU); W 5–4	Muhammad Irfandi Nurkamil (INA); L 2–5	—N/a		4th	Wiriyatangsakul (THA); L 2–15	Did not advance			
Heng Rithy / Sorn Sinat / Phirak Phearin / In Sovannsereypich	Team sabre	—N/a								Voragun Srinualnad / Chinnawat Tamniyom / Kanisorn Pangmoon / Wiriyatangsakul (THA); L 23–45	Did not advance		

=== Women's ===
Athlete	Event	Pool Stage						Round of 16	Quarterfinals	Semifinals	Final / BM	
Athlete	Event	Opposition Score	Opposition Score	Opposition Score	Opposition Score	Opposition Score	Rank	Opposition Score	Opposition Score	Opposition Score	Opposition Score	Rank
Sokha Yasoursdey	Individual épée	Elle Meihui Koh (SGP); L 1–5	Phuong Kim Nguyen (VIE); L 1–5	Ivy Claire Dinoy (PHI); L 1–5	Warisa Winya (THA); L 1–5	—N/a	5th	Did not advance				
Men Monika	Individual épée	Kiria Tikanah (SGP); L 2–5	Thi Hong Vu (VIE); L 1–5	Alexa Ong Larrazabal (PHI); L 2–5	Pacharaporn Vasanasomsithi (THA); L 3–5	—N/a	5th	Did not advance				
Men Monika / Sam Rathadarin / Sokha Yasoursdey	Team épée	—N/a							Warisa Winya / Sasiphon Poonket / Pacharaporn Vasanasomsithi / Korawan Thanee (THA); L 12–45	Did not advance		
Hai Sreysros	Individual foil	Sasinpat Doungpattra (THA); L 1–5	Thi Thu Phuong Nguyen (VIE); L 0–5	Leoda Luny Winona (INA); L 0–5	Samantha Catantan (PHI); L 1–5	Kemei Cheung (SGP); L 2–5	6th	Did not advance				
Hai Sreysros	Individual foil	Shinnakerdchoke (THA); L 0–5	Thi Thanh Nhan Luu (VIE); L 2–5	Surayya Rizzal (MAS); L 1–5	Maricar Mantego Matienzo (PHI); L 3–5	Maxine Jie Xin Wong (SGP); L 1–5	6th	Did not advance				
Hai Sreysros / Yi Lyza / Le Hariza	Team foil	—N/a							Sasinpat Doungpattra / Naramol Longthong / Shinnakerdchoke / Ploypailin Thongchampa (THA); L 19–45	Did not advance		
Sorn Nich	Individual sabre	Tonkhaw Phokaew (THA); W 5–4	Thi Thu Ha Bui (VIE); W 5–4	Jylyn Porto Nicanor (PHI); L 4–5	Jie Min Juliet Heng (SGP); L 2–5	Resha Shaveena Sabaratnam (MAS); W 5–2	3rd	Resha Shaveena Sabaratnam (MAS); W 15–13	Jylyn Porto Nicanor (PHI); L 11–15	Did not advance		
Sorn Nich	Individual sabre	Bandhita Srinualnad (THA); W 5–3	Thi Khanh Linh Phung (VIE); W 5–3	Allaine Nicole Cortey (PHI); L 4–5	Shu Hui Jessica Ong (SGP); W 5–3	Hjh Anis Hj Yahya (BRU); W 5–3	1st	Bye	Thi Khanh Linh Phung (VIE); W 15–9	Shu Hui Jessica Ong (SGP); L 13–15	Did not advance	3rd place, bronze medalist(s)
Chhay Linly / Pen Narita / Sorn Nich / Yi Liza	Team sabre	—N/a							Bye	Allaine Cortey / Queen Dalmacio / Jylyn Nicanor / Andrea Sayson (THA); L 40–45	Did not advance	3rd place, bronze medalist(s)

== Floorball ==
Team	Event	Group Stage					Final / BM	
Team	Event	Opposition Score	Opposition Score	Opposition Score	Opposition Score	Rank	Opposition Score	Rank
Men's	Men's tournament	Singapore; L 1–12	Thailand; L 1–18	Malaysia; L 1–10	Philippines; L 3–13	5th	Did not advance	
Women's	Women's tournament	Singapore; L 0–16	Thailand; L 0–13	Malaysia; L 2–11	Philippines; L 3–14	5th	Did not advance	

== Football ==
Team	Event	Group Stage					Semifinals	Final / BM	
Team	Event	Opposition Score	Opposition Score	Opposition Score	Opposition Score	Rank	Opposition Score	Opposition Score	Rank
Men's	Men's tournament	Timor-Leste; W 4–0	Philippines; D 1–1	Myanmar; L 0–2	Indonesia; L 1–2	3	Did not advance		
Women's	Women's tournament	Laos; W 2–0	Singapore; W 1–0	Thailand; L 0–3	—N/a	2	Vietnam; L 0–4	Thailand; L 0–6	4

=== Men's tournament ===
Group A

Pos	Team	Pld	W	D	L	GF	GA	GD	Pts	Qualification
1	Indonesia	4	4	0	0	13	1	+12	12	Advance to Semi-finals
2	Myanmar	4	3	0	1	4	5	−1	9	Advance to Semi-finals
3	Cambodia (H)	4	1	1	2	6	5	+1	4	
4	Timor-Leste	4	1	0	3	3	8	−5	3	
5	Philippines	4	0	1	3	1	8	−7	1	

Source: FIFA
(H) Hosts
29 April 2023
19:00

Cambodia	4–0	Timor-Leste
Sinti 38', 45+2'; Rotana 73'; Pisoth 82'	Report

Olympic Stadium, Phnom Penh
Attendance: 29,985
Referee: Abdullah Jamali (Kuwait)
2 May 2023
19:00

Philippines	1–1	Cambodia
Cariño 90+3'	Report	Rina 26'

Olympic Stadium, Phnom Penh
Attendance: 30,118
Referee: Nazmi Nasaruddin (Malaysia)
7 May 2023
19:00

Myanmar	2–0	Cambodia
Hein Htet Aung 12'; Thet Hein Soe 38'

Olympic Stadium, Phnom Penh
Attendance: 32,804
Referee: Qasim Al-Hatmi (Oman)
10 May 2023
19:00

Cambodia	1–2	Indonesia
Sovannmakara 45+1'	Report	Titan 9'; Beckham 52'

Olympic Stadium, Phnom Penh
Attendance: 29,168
Referee: Shen Yinhao (China)

=== Women's tournament ===
Group B

Pos	Team	Pld	W	D	L	GF	GA	GD	Pts	Qualification
1	Thailand	3	3	0	0	13	0	+13	9	Advance to Semi-finals
2	Cambodia (H)	3	2	0	1	3	3	0	6	Advance to Semi-finals
3	Singapore	3	1	0	2	2	6	−4	3	
4	Laos	3	0	0	3	1	10	−9	0	

Source: FIFA
(H) Hosts
3 May 2023
20:00

Cambodia	2–0	Laos
Yoeurn 10', 37'

RSN Stadium, Phnom Penh
Attendance: 4,530
6 May 2023
20:00

Singapore	0–1	Cambodia
		Kunthea 76' (pen.)

RSN Stadium, Phnom Penh
Attendance: 4,725
Referee: Mahnaz Zokaee (Iran)
9 May 2023
20:00

Cambodia	0–3	Thailand
		Panittha 23'; Nualanong 45+2'; Jiraporn 90+3'

RSN Stadium, Phnom Penh
Attendance: 5,525

Semi-finals

12 May 2023
19:00

Vietnam	4–0	Cambodia
Ngân Thị Vạn Sự 20'; Phạm Hải Yến 30'; Trần Thị Thùy Trang 36' (pen.); Huỳnh Như 90+3' (pen.)

Olympic Stadium, Phnom Penh
Attendance: 9,849
Referee: Mahnaz Zokaee (Iran)

Bronze medal match

15 May 2023
16:00

Cambodia	0–6	Thailand
		Saowalak 16', 33'; Jiraporn 25'; Panittha 52'; Pattaranan 54', 88'

Olympic Stadium, Phnom Penh
Attendance: 1,107
Referee: Tian Jin (China)

== Hockey ==
=== Field hockey ===
Team	Event	Group Stage					Final / BM	
Team	Event	Opposition Score	Opposition Score	Opposition Score	Opposition Score	Rank	Opposition Score	Rank
Men's	Men's tournament	Thailand; L 1–2	Malaysia; L 0–6	Indonesia; L 0–4	Singapore; L 1–4	5	Did not advance	
Women's	Women's tournament	Thailand; L 1–5	Malaysia; L 1–8	Indonesia; D 0–0	Singapore; D 2–2	5	Did not advance	

=== Indoor hockey ===
Team	Event	Group Stage						Final / BM	
Team	Event	Opposition Score	Opposition Score	Opposition Score	Opposition Score	Opposition Score	Rank	Opposition Score	Rank
Men's	Men's tournament	Malaysia; L 1–10	Singapore; L 1–4	Thailand; L 1–7	Indonesia; L 1–6	Philippines; W 8–0	5	Did not advance	
Women's	Women's tournament	Indonesia; L 1–7	Thailand; L 0–9	Singapore; W 1–0	Malaysia; L 0–4	Philippines; W 9–0	4	Did not advance	3rd place, bronze medalist(s)

== Karate ==
=== Kumite ===
Athlete	Event	Semifinals	Final	
Athlete	Event	Opposition Score	Opposition Score	Rank
Steves Yuthana Tep	Men's 55 kg	Van Vu Tran (VIE); L 0–1 R.P.C	Did not advance	
Ly Kouyhav	Men's 60 kg	Jayson Ramil Macaalay (PHI); W 8–3 R.P.C	Did not advance	3rd place, bronze medalist(s)
Virak Bouth Crun	Men's 67 kg	Tebing Hutapea (INA); W 3–1	John Matthew Manantan (PHI); W 2–1	1st place, gold medalist(s)
Sot Phanith	Men's 75 kg	?	Sharmendran Raghonathan (MAS); L 5–6	2nd place, silver medalist(s)
Sreang Virak	Men's 84 kg	Teerapat Kanabkaew (THA); L 2–4 R.P.C	Did not advance	
Peng Sakkada	Men's +84 kg	Le Tan Dat Tran (VIE); W 8–0	Teerawat Kangtong (THA); L 4–5	2nd place, silver medalist(s)
Sreang Virak; Nguon Sokkrayleng; Chheav Reaksa; Bin Mengly; Sot Phanith; Peng Sakkada; Ly Kouyhav	Men's team	Brunei; W 3–0 R.P.C	Did not advance	3rd place, bronze medalist(s)
Lim Sok Vicheka	Women's 55 kg	Madhuri Poovanesan (MAS); L 3–6 R.P.C	Did not advance	
Vann Chakriya	Women's 61 kg	?	Jamie Lim (PHI); L 1–3	2nd place, silver medalist(s)
Han Sara	Women's 68 kg	Remon Villaneuva Misu (PHI); L 4–6	Did not advance	2nd place, silver medalist(s)
Niza San	Women's +68 kg	?		3rd place, bronze medalist(s)
Chon Srey Chea; Niza San; Lim Sok Vicheka; Han Sara	Women's team	Indonesia; L 0–2 R.P.C	Did not advance	

=== Kata ===
Athlete	Event	Final / BM	
Athlete	Event	Opposition Score	Rank
Chheng Chandararattanak; Heng Ho; Theng Kimchhea	Men's team	Felix Cantero Calipusan; Giovanni Ephraim Apuya; Jeremy Laurence Nopre (PHI); W 39.7–39.5	3rd place, bronze medalist(s)
Rith Kimleang	Women's individual	Krisda Putri Aprilia (INA); L 0–1	—N/a
That Chhenghorng; Puthea Sreynuch; Oun Sreyda; Rith Kimleang	Women's team	Farhah Syahirah Shamrin; Farhana Najeeha Rahman; Rodhyatul Adhwanna Bakar (BRU); W 39–36.8	3rd place, bronze medalist(s)

== Martial arts ==
=== Jujitsu ===
==== Duo ====
Athlete	Event	Pool Stage			
Athlete	Event	Opposition Score	Opposition Score	Opposition Score	Rank
Kongmona Mithora; Touch Pikada	Men's duo	Dinh Khai Ma; Ke Duong Trinh (VIE); W 66–63	Jan Harvey Navarro; Karl Dale Navarro (PHI); W 66–59	Nawin Kokaew; Panuwat Deeyatam (THA); W 67.5–63.5	1st place, gold medalist(s)
Heng Seavheang; Tin Sovanlina	Women's duo	Minh Phuong Nguyen; Thi Lan Huong Hoang (VIE); W 64.5–53.5	Andrea Divina; Louann Gutierrez (PHI); W 64–48	Kanyarat Phaophan; Panyaporn Phaophan (THA); L 65–65.5	2nd place, silver medalist(s)
Heng Seavheang; Kongmona Mithora	Mixed duo	Cong Nguyen Sai; Ngoc Tra Luong (VIE); W 67–62.5	Christopher Gallego; Estie Liwanen (PHI); W 63.5–48.5	Lalita Yuennan; Warawut Saengsriruang (THA); L 65.5–74.5	2nd place, silver medalist(s)

==== Show ====
Athlete	Event	Score	Rank
Kongmona Mithora; Touch Pikada	Men's show	46	1st place, gold medalist(s)
Heng Seavheang; Tin Sovanlina	Women's show	42.5	2nd place, silver medalist(s)
Sor Sophanuth; Tin Sovanlina	Mixed show	45.5	2nd place, silver medalist(s)

==== Combat ====
Athlete	Event	Pool Stage				Quarterfinals	Semifinals	Final / BM	
Athlete	Event	Opposition Score	Opposition Score	Opposition Score	Opposition Score	Opposition Score	Opposition Score	Opposition Score	Rank
Than Andrew	Men's ne-waza gi – 62 kg	Suwijak Kuntong (THA); L 0–50	Van Thang Can (VIE); L 0–50	Amirul Syafiq Eran (SGP); L 0–7	Myron Mangubat (PHI); L 0–5	—N/a			5th
Hour Senghong	Men's ne-waza nogi – 69 kg	—N/a				Bye	Jedidah Phomsavath Slayman (LAO); L 0–50	Did not advance	3rd place, bronze medalist(s)
Touch Rickie Sothavuth	Men's ne-waza nogi – 69 kg	—N/a				Dinh Tung Dang (VIE); L 0–7	Did not advance	Noah Lim (SGP); L 0–50	QF
Jessa Khan	Women's ne-waza gi – 52 kg	May Yong Teh (SGP); W 50–0	Thi Huyen Dang (VIE); W 50–0	Nuchanat Singchalad (THA); W 50–0	Jenna Kaila Napolis (PHI); L 0–2	—N/a			2nd place, silver medalist(s)
Jessa Khan	Women's ne-waza nogi – 52 kg	Thi Hue Phung (VIE); W 0–0 (A: 1–0)	Benyatip Phumthong (THA); W 50–0	Margarita Ochoa (PHI); W 50–0	May Yong Teh (SGP); W 50–0	—N/a			1st place, gold medalist(s)
Mab Sokhouy	Women's ne-waza nogi – 57 kg	Thi Thuong Le (VIE); L 0–2	Annie Lemosenero Ramirez (PHI); L 0–50	Orapa Senatham (THA); L 0–7	—N/a				3rd place, bronze medalist(s)

=== Kickboxing ===
==== Kick light ====
Athlete	Event	Quarterfinals	Semifinals	Final	
Athlete	Event	Opposition Score	Opposition Score	Opposition Score	Rank
Met Borin	Men's 63 kg	Alexandre Mangkron Berrie (THA); W 2–1	Abdul Aziz (INA); L 1–2	Did not advance	3rd place, bronze medalist(s)
Tep Yinyan	Men's 69 kg	Bye	Ahmad Hakim (MAS); L 0–3	Did not advance	3rd place, bronze medalist(s)
Chhat Chanmony	Women's 55 kg	Bye	Gina Iniong Araos (PHI); L 0–3	Did not advance	3rd place, bronze medalist(s)

==== Full contact ====
Athlete	Event	Quarterfinals	Semifinals	Final	
Athlete	Event	Opposition Score	Opposition Score	Opposition Score	Rank
Von Kimcheng	Men's 54 kg	Mikko Manzano Camingawan (PHI); L 0–3	Did not advance		QF
Phoin Chanthy	Men's 60 kg	Bye	Soukan Taipanyavong (LAO); L 1–2	Did not advance	3rd place, bronze medalist(s)
Lorn Panha	Men's 67 kg	Bye	The Huong Nguyen (VIE); W 2–1	Abdul Haris Sofyan (INA); W 3–0	1st place, gold medalist(s)
Oeurn Siphan	Women's 48 kg	Paula Rewade Saruke (INA); L 0–3	Did not advance		QF

==== Low kick ====
Athlete	Event	Quarterfinals	Semifinals	Final	
Athlete	Event	Opposition Score	Opposition Score	Opposition Score	Rank
Sok Rith	Men's 51 kg	Chaithong Raseesaroch (THA); W 3–0	Wassof Rumijam (MAS); W 3–0	Van Tuan Huynh (VIE); W 2–1	1st place, gold medalist(s)
Toch Rachhan	Men's 57 kg	Fransiskus Sinaga (INA); W 3–0	Chaiwat Sungnoi (THA); W 2–1	Quang Huy Nguyen (VIE); W 2–1	1st place, gold medalist(s)
San Rakim	Men's 63.5 kg	Hoang Nguyen (VIE); W 3–0	Chaleamlap Santidongsakun (THA); W 2–1	Jean Claude Saclag (PHI); L 0–3	2nd place, silver medalist(s)
Chhoeung Lvay	Men's 71 kg	Teunchaleun Anong (LAO); W 3–0	Duy Quan Kieu (VIE); W 3–0	Thanaphat Tonphosi (THA); W 2–1	1st place, gold medalist(s)
Vy Sreychhay	Women's 56 kg	Chutima Chotlam (THA); W 2–1	Gretel de Paz (PHI); L 1–2	Did not advance	3rd place, bronze medalist(s)

==== Light contact ====
Athlete	Event	Quarterfinals	Semifinals	Final	
Athlete	Event	Opposition Score	Opposition Score	Opposition Score	Rank
Rin Davit	Men's 63 kg	Bye	Dinh Thai Nguyen (VIE); W 2–1	Korrakot Wijitnavee (THA); W 3–0	1st place, gold medalist(s)
Chan Vicheka	Women's 50 kg	Paweena Phalakan (THA); W 2–1	Fitzchel Fermato (PHI); L 1–2	Did not advance	3rd place, bronze medalist(s)

==== K-1 ====
Athlete	Event	Quarterfinals	Semifinals	Final	
Athlete	Event	Opposition Score	Opposition Score	Opposition Score	Rank
Sainy Sainet	Men's 51 kg	Bye	Tuan Kiet Nguyen (VIE); W 3–0	Salmri Stendra Pattisamallo (INA); W 3–0	1st place, gold medalist(s)
Yuon Vansinh	Men's 67 kg	Van Chinh Hoang (VIE); L 0–3	Did not advance		QF
Nao Srey Pov	Women's 52 kg	Claudine Veloso (PHI); L 1–2	Did not advance		QF

=== Kun bokator ===
==== Form ====
Athlete	Event	Score	Rank
Pech Ponler	Men's Single Bare Hands Form	7.8192	2nd place, silver medalist(s)
Kim Titsovathanak	Men's Single Bamboo Shield Form	8.2492	1st place, gold medalist(s)
Punleu Pichmorakoth	Men's Single Bokator Spirit Form	7.9992	1st place, gold medalist(s)
Ey Sam Oun	Men's Single Phkak Form	7.4993	1st place, gold medalist(s)
Kim Titsovathanak; Yim Vutha	Men's Duo Performance (Pair)	8.4992	2nd place, silver medalist(s)
Pech Ponler; Yim Vutha; Ok Riththeany	Men's Team Bare Hands Form (Team/Trio)	8.4992	2nd place, silver medalist(s)
Yuos Sanchana	Women's Single Bare Hands Form	7.7492	1st place, gold medalist(s)
Puth Chanchhorvy	Women's Single Bamboo Shield Form	8.4658	2nd place, silver medalist(s)
Mao Leakena	Women's Single Bokator Spirit Form	8.7491	1st place, gold medalist(s)
Sin Sivesien	Women's Single Phkak Form	8.8325	1st place, gold medalist(s)
Puth Chanchhorvy; Yuos Sanchana; Sen Sarifa	Women's Team Bare Hands Form (Team/Trio)	8.3325	2nd place, silver medalist(s)
Ey Sam Oun; Sen Sarifa; Punleu Pichmorakoth	Mixed's 1 Women Against 2 Men (Team)	8.4992	2nd place, silver medalist(s)

==== Combat ====
Athlete	Event	Quarterfinals	Semifinals	Final	
Athlete	Event	Opposition Score	Opposition Score	Opposition Score	Rank
Sovan Nang	Men's 50 kg	Bye	Robin Sornito Catalan (PHI); L 1–2	Did not advance	3rd place, bronze medalist(s)
Nget Deb	Men's 55 kg	Bye	Obaja Halomoan Sianturi (INA); W 3–0	Ariel Lee Biadno Lampacan (PHI); W 2–1	1st place, gold medalist(s)
Chet Chon	Men's 60 kg	Bye	Phillip Deploma Delarmino (PHI); W 3–0	Kamal Maulansyah (INA); W 3–0	1st place, gold medalist(s)
Ouk Pat	Men's 65 kg	Ryan Tarang Jakiri (PHI); L 0–3	Did not advance		
Sin Kimheng	Men's 70 kg	Damsoumphone Khieosavath (LAO); L 1–2	Did not advance		
Leang Sreynith	Women's 45 kg	Bye	Miftahul Jannah (INA); W 3–0	Thi Phuong Pham (VIE); L 1–2	2nd place, silver medalist(s)
Sok Bunheourn	Women's 50 kg	Vilayphone Vongphachan (LAO); W 3–0	Thi Thanh Tien Nguyen (VIE); L 1–2	Did not advance	3rd place, bronze medalist(s)
Sok Samphors	Women's 55 kg	Bye	Thi Tuyet Mai Nguyen (VIE); L 0–3	Did not advance	3rd place, bronze medalist(s)
Bo Chanthy	Women's 60 kg	Meri Ann Geli Bulaong (PHI); L 1–2	Did not advance		

=== Kun Khmer ===
==== Kun Kru ====
Athlete	Event	Score	Rank
Meng Hong Kan	Men's Kun Kru	49	1st place, gold medalist(s)
Soeng Moeuy	Women's Kun Kru	49	1st place, gold medalist(s)

==== Men's event ====
Athlete	Event	Quarterfinals	Semifinals	Final	
Athlete	Event	Opposition Score	Opposition Score	Opposition Score	Rank
Mab Theara	45 kg	—N/a	Banxadeth Sybou (LAO); W 29–28	Nhuan Phong Vo (VIE); W 10–9 K.O.	1st place, gold medalist(s)
Phun Piseth	48 kg	—N/a	Bye	Duc Bao Duong (VIE); W 29–28	1st place, gold medalist(s)
Kham Khalaneang	51 kg	Whinny Guindayan Bayawon (PHI); W 30–27	Somboun Banxadeth (LAO); W 30–27	Cong Nghi Le (VIE); W 30–27	1st place, gold medalist(s)
Him Koemrieng	54 kg	Bye	Hein Thu Aung (MYA); W 10–8 K.O.	Soukna Keothatalath (LAO); W 10–9 K.O.	1st place, gold medalist(s)
Him Koemrieng	57 kg	—N/a	Thanh Trung Nguyen (VIE); W 30–27	Kristian Salatan Narca (PHI); W 30–27	1st place, gold medalist(s)
Him Koemrieng	60 kg	Bye	Muhammad Akashah Ramli (MAS); W 20–17	Attaxay Sihabout (LAO); W 30–27	1st place, gold medalist(s)
Khun Bora	63.5 kg	—N/a	Cao Minh Phat Truong (VIE); W 30–27	Soubinh Banxadeth (LAO); W 0–0 K.O.	1st place, gold medalist(s)
Lao Chetra	67 kg	Bye	Athachai Saiphawat Kiang (MAS); W 0–0 K.O.	Chau Dat Nguyen (VIE); W 20–18 K.O.	1st place, gold medalist(s)
Tit Sorphorn	71 kg	Bye	Bounma Bouddala (LAO); W 0–0 K.O.	Hong Quan Nguyen (VIE); W 0–0 W.O.	1st place, gold medalist(s)
Lao Chantra	75 kg	—N/a	Bye	Thanh Tung Nguyen (VIE); W 29–28	1st place, gold medalist(s)
Prom Samnang	81 kg	—N/a	Bye	Tun Tun Min (MYA); W 30–27	1st place, gold medalist(s)

==== Women's event ====
Athlete	Event	Quarterfinals	Semifinals	Final	
Athlete	Event	Opposition Score	Opposition Score	Opposition Score	Rank
Chha Chandeng	45 kg	—N/a	Ha Huu Hieu Huynh (VIE); L 26–30	Did not advance	3rd place, bronze medalist(s)
Sokry Konyka	48 kg	—N/a	May Thazin Htoo (MYA); L 27–30	Did not advance	3rd place, bronze medalist(s)
Soeng Moeuy	51 kg	Khounheuan Khamkieo (LAO); W 20–17 K.O.	Zyra Gados Bon-as (PHI); W 30–27	Thi Phuong Thuy Trieu (VIE); L 27–30	2nd place, silver medalist(s)
Touch Chanvotey	54 kg	—N/a	Jenelyn Dasdas Olsim (PHI); W 30–27	Thi Chieu Nguyen (VIE); W 29–28	1st place, gold medalist(s)
Toun Sreyphin	57 kg	—N/a	Duangchay Thalengliep (LAO); W 30–27	Bui Yen Ly (VIE); L 26–30	2nd place, silver medalist(s)
Sam Samnang	60 kg	—N/a	Bye	Thi Mai Bang (VIE); L 0–0 K.O.	2nd place, silver medalist(s)

== Pencak silat ==
=== Seni (artistic) ===
Athlete	Event	Round of 16	Quarterfinals	Semifinals	Final	
Athlete	Event	Opposition Score	Opposition Score	Opposition Score	Opposition Score	Rank
Soem Sokdevid	Men's singles	Bye	Ilyas Sadara (THA); W 9.95–9.935	Muhammad Iqbal Abdul Rahman (SGP); W 9.955–9.935	Muhammad Khairul Shaddad Ardi (MAS); W 9.96–9.93	1st place, gold medalist(s)
Khai Bunnary	Women's singles	—N/a	Thi Binh Vuong (VIE); L 9.90–9.95	Did not advance		
Heng Chandy; Loch Oudom	Men's doubles	—N/a		Alfau Jan Esmael Abad; Almohaidib Esmael Abad (PHI); L 9.77–9.94	Did not advance	3rd place, bronze medalist(s)
Phoen Sreyneang; Son Sothea	Women's doubles	—N/a		Oraya Choosuwan; Saowanee Chanthamunee (THA); L 9.685–9.955	Did not advance	3rd place, bronze medalist(s)
Chea Sarith; Chhuoy Silath; Nok Sokea	Men's team	—N/a	Bye	Abdulkarim Koolee; Salwa Cheha; Sobri Cheni (THA); L 9.905–9.955	Did not advance	3rd place, bronze medalist(s)
By Siv Chheng; Chun Reaksa; Ham Dalin	Women's team	—N/a	Bye	Amirah binte Sahrin; Iffah Batrisyia binte Noh; Nur Ashikin binte Zulkifli (SGP); L 9.88–9.955	Did not advance	3rd place, bronze medalist(s)

=== Tanding (match) ===
==== Men ====
Athlete	Event	Round of 16	Quarterfinals	Semifinals	Final	
Athlete	Event	Opposition Score	Opposition Score	Opposition Score	Opposition Score	Rank
Non Sromoachkroham	Class U45 (–45 kg)	—N/a		Muhammad Khairul Shaddad Ardi (MAS); W 20–0	Bayu Lesmana (INA); W 20–0	1st place, gold medalist(s)
Vorn Soksreymompisal	Class A (45–50kg)	—N/a	Muhammad Shaiman Johanis (SGP); W 63–50	Khoirudin Mustakim (INA); L 0–20	Did not advance	3rd place, bronze medalist(s)
Chhim Rachhat	Class B (50–55kg)	—N/a	Thanaphonh Simphilavong (LAO); W 20–0	Sarayut Srakaew (THA); L 20–39	Did not advance	3rd place, bronze medalist(s)
Chuon Vin	Class C (55–60kg)	—N/a	Muhamad Yachser Arafa (INA); L 17–36	Did not advance		
At Chandy	Class D (60–65kg)	—N/a	Bye	Muhammad Izzul Irfan Marzuki (MAS); L 6–27	Did not advance	3rd place, bronze medalist(s)
Ngen Vanthai	Class E (65–70kg)	—N/a	Tito Hendra Septia Kurnia (INA); L 15–61	Did not advance		
Ngen Vanthai	Class F (70–75kg)	Bye	Aekarat Maehchi (THA); L 4–31	Did not advance		
Lao Chamroeurnrith	Class G (75–80kg)	—N/a	Tan San Nguyen (VIE); L 5–48	Did not advance		
Chom Somhea	Class H (80–85kg)	—N/a	Duy Tuyen Nguyen (VIE); L 6–35	Did not advance		
Un Sovannara	Class I (85–90kg)	—N/a	Saranon Glompan (THA); L 0–20	Did not advance		

=== Women ===
Athlete	Event	Quarterfinals	Semifinals	Final	
Athlete	Event	Opposition Score	Opposition Score	Opposition Score	Rank
By Siv Chheng	Class U45 (–45 kg)	Norsyakirah Muksin (MAS); L 0–46	Did not advance		
Yong Lita	Class A (45–50 kg)	Angeline Abordo Virina (PHI); L 15–17	Did not advance		
Tho Sreynich	Class B (50–55 kg)	Safira Dwi Meilani (INA); L 9–54	Did not advance		
Chourn Sotheara	Class C (55–60 kg)	—N/a	Jeni Elvis Kause (INA); L 0–20	Did not advance	3rd place, bronze medalist(s)
Phyrom Moniroth	Class D (60–65 kg)	Bye	Siti Shazwana Ajak (MAS); L 5–46	Did not advance	3rd place, bronze medalist(s)
Kun Vanita	Class E (65–70 kg)	Bye	Nia Larasati (INA); L 10–46	Did not advance	3rd place, bronze medalist(s)

== Sepak takraw ==
=== Chinlone ===
==== Men's ====
Athlete	Event	Preliminary Round	Final Round	
Athlete	Event	Score	Score	Rank
Di Chanthea; Kien Korn; Ngorn Theara; Nuth Visal; Oum Sansovin; Pheng Mithona; Phom Kongkia; Seng Sovannara	Linking	274	268	3rd place, bronze medalist(s)
Chhorn Sokhom; Cheat Khemrin; Sen Sie; Oum Sansovin; Houth Sovoutha; Dem Tiya; Nom Hapchhun; Heng Rawut	Non-repetition primary	327	340	1st place, gold medalist(s)
Chan Minea; Chhorn Sokhom; Di Chanthea; Heng Rawut; Nom Hapchhun; Nuth Visal; Sen Sier; Seng Sovannara	Non-repetition secondary	68	73	3rd place, bronze medalist(s)
Heng Rawut; Houth Sovoutha; Kien Korn; Ngorn Theara; Peng Mithona; Phom Kongkia; Sam Veasna; Sorn Channem	Same strokes	185	175	3rd place, bronze medalist(s)

==== Women's ====
Athlete	Event	Preliminary Round	Final Round	
Athlete	Event	Score	Score	Rank
Chea Raksmei; Ly Sreypich; Pen Dinet; Pho Panha; San Bopha; San Sophorn; Vann Socheata; Yong Vuoch Ly	Linking	192	196	3rd place, bronze medalist(s)
Chea Raksmei; Ly Sreypich; Nuth Karona; Orm Vuoch Leang; Pho Panha; San Sophorn; Un Sreynich; Vann Socheata	Non-repetition primary	219	227	1st place, gold medalist(s)
Nuth Karona; Orm Vuoch Leang; Pho Panha; San Bopha; San Sophorn; Un Sreynich; Vann Socheata; Yong Vuoch Ly	Non-repetition secondary	47	45	3rd place, bronze medalist(s)
Chea Raksmei; Ly Srey Pich; Nuth Karona; Orm Vuoch Leang; Pho Panha; San Sophorn; Un Sreynich; Vann Socheata	Same stroke	156	182	2nd place, silver medalist(s)

==== Mixed's ====
Athlete	Event	Preliminary Round	Final Round	
Athlete	Event	Score	Score	Rank
Chan Minea; Chea Raksmei; Chhorn Saikhom; Dem Tiya; Ly Sreypich; Nuth Karona; Phom Kongkia; Vann Socheata	Linking	245	243	3rd place, bronze medalist(s)
Cheat Khemrin; Chhorn Sokhom; Heng Rawut; Nhoem Sreyneat; Orm Vuoch Leang; Pho Panha; Sen Sie; Un Sreynich	Non-repetition primary	244	250	1st place, gold medalist(s)
Chea Raksmei; Heng Rawut; Nuth Karona; Nuth Visal; Pen Dinet; Sam Veasna; San Sophorn; Sorn Channem	Same stroke	170	206	1st place, gold medalist(s)

=== Sepak takraw ===
==== Men's ====
Athlete	Event	Pool Stage				Semifinals	Final	
Athlete	Event	Opposition Score	Opposition Score	Opposition Score	Rank	Opposition Score	Opposition Score	Rank
Kien Korn / Pheng Mithona / Sam Veasna / Sen Si E / Sorn Channem	Regu	Khairul Fahmi Yazid / Muhd Afif Safiee / Muhd Asri Aron / Muhd Danish Irfan Faizal / Muhd Ramli Sa'ari (SGP); L 0–2 (12–21, 21–23)	Amirul Zazwan Amir / Mohd Azlan Alias / Mohd Syahir Rosdi / Muhd Afifuddin Razali / Muhd Zulkifli Abd Razak (MAS); L 0–2 (7–21, 11–21)	Varayut Jantarasena / Kritsanapong Nontakote / Siriwat Sakha / Thawisak Thongsai / Pattarapong Yupadee (THA); L 0–2 (4–21, 10–21)	3rd place, bronze medalist(s)	—N/a		
Chan Minea / Di Chanthea / Houth Sovoutha / Kien Korn / Ngorn Theara / Oum Sansovin / Pheng Mithona / Phom Kongkia / Sam Veasna /Sen Si E /Seng Sovannara / Sorn Channem	Team Regu	Amirul Zazwan Amir / Mohd Azlan Alias / Mohd Syahir Rosdi / Aidil Aiman Azwawi / Meor Mohd Zulfikar Mat Amin / Muhd Afifuddin Razali / Muhd Haziq Hairul Nizam / Muhd Noraizat Nordin / Norfaizzul Abd Razak / Muhd Zulkifli Abd Razak / Muhd Hafizul Hayazi Adnan / Khairol Zaman Hamir Akhbar (MAS); L 0–3	Varayut Jantarasena / Jantarit Khukaeo / Kritsanapong Nontakote / Jirasak Pakbuangoen / Poottipong Pukdee / Siriwat Sakha / Phutawan Sopa / Thawisak Thongsai / Pornthep Tinbangbon / Yodsawat Uthaijaronsri / Rachan Viphan / Pattarapong Yupadee (THA); L 0–3	—N/a	3rd place, bronze medalist(s)	—N/a		
Nom Hapchhum / Nuth Visal / Chhorn Sokhom	Doubles	Aidil Aiman Azwawi / Muhd Noraizat Nordin / Muhd Hafizul Hayazi Adnan (MAS); L 0–2 (14–21, 11–21)	Muhammed Ramli Bin Sa'ari / Khairul Fahmi Bin Yazid / Muhammed Afif Bin Safiee (SGP); L 0–2 (14–21, 11–21)	Sitt Lin Htut / Thant Zin Oo / Zin Ko Ko (MYA); L 0–2 (3–21, 7–21)	4th	Did not advance		
Chan Minea / Di Chanthea / Cheat Khemrin / Oum Sansovin / Pheng Mithona / Phom Kongkia / Sam Veasna /Seng Sovannara / Nuth Visal / Dem Tiya	Team Doubles	Đầu Văn Hoàng / Huy Manh Ha / Huỳnh Ngọc Sang / Ngô Thành Long / Nguyễn Hoàng Lân / Nguyễn Huy Quyền / Nguyễn Văn Lý / Tăng Minh Khoa / Vương Minh Châu (VIE); L 0–3	Laksanaxay Bounphaivanh / Khammeung Monphachan / Sommanyvanh Phakonekham / Bounyong Phetsakhone / Khamlek Sodahuk / Noum Souvannalith / Saviden Vorlavongsa / Toule Xaiyavongsone / Kongsy Yang (LAO); L 0–3	—N/a	3rd	Did not advance		
Kien Korn / Ngorn Theara / Nom Hapchhun / Sam Veasna/ Sen Si E/ Sorn Channem	Quadrant	Kritsanapong Nontakote / Phutawan Sopa / Thawisak Thongsai / Pornthep Tinbangbon / Yodsawat Uthaijaronsri / Rachan Viphan (THA); L 0–2 (8–21, 8–21)	Timor-Leste; W 2–0 W.O.	—N/a	2nd	Andi Try Sandi Saputra / Diky Apriyadi / Muhammed Hardiansyah Muliang / Muhammad Hafidz / Rusdi Rusdi / Saiful Rijal (INA); L 0–2 (8–21, 10–21)	Did not advance	3rd place, bronze medalist(s)

Athlete	Event	Preliminary Round	Final Round	
Athlete	Event	Score	Score	Rank
Cheat Khemrin; Chhorn Sokhom; Heng Rawut; Houth Sovoutha; Nom Hapchhun; Nuth Visal	Hoop	510	460	3rd place, bronze medalist(s)

==== Women's ====
Athlete	Event	Pool Stage					Semifinals	Final	
Athlete	Event	Opposition Score	Opposition Score	Opposition Score	Opposition Score	Rank	Opposition Score	Opposition Score	Rank
Chea Raksmei / Un Sreynich / Orm Vuoch Leang	Doubles	Khin Hnin Wai / Phyu Phyu Tuan / Yamon Zin (MYA); L 0–2 (9–21, 10–21)	Nguyen Thi Yen / Tran Thi Ngoc Yen / Nguyen Thi Ngoc Huyen (VIE); L 0–2 (4–21, 5–21)	Fujy Anggy Lestari / Kusnelia Kusnelia / Lena Lena (INA); L 0–2 (7–21, 14–21)	Sonsavan Keosouliya / Norkham Vongxay / Koy Xayavong (LAO); L 0–2 (18–21, 12–21)	5th	—N/a		
Chea Raksmei / Ly Srey Pich / Nuth Karona / Orm Vuoch Leang / Pen Dinet / Pho Panha / San Sophorn / Un Sreynich / Vann Socheata	Team Doubles	Timor-Leste; W 3–0 W.O.	Manlika Bunthod / Wiphada Chitphuan / Masaya Duangsri / Sirinan Khiaopak / Pruksa Maneewong / Somruedee Pruepruk / Kaewjai Pumsawangkaew / Payom Srihongsa / Ratsamee Thongsod (THA); L 0–3	Siti Norzubaidah Wahab / Nur Natasha Amyra Fazil / Nur Syafiqah Jafri / Nur Fatihah Sharudin / Madziatul Rosmahani Saidin / Nur Athirah Roslan / Razmah Adam / Nadillatul Rosmahani Saidin / Sharifah Fifi Nurdyana Rahim (MAS); L 0–3	Lae Inthavong / Sonsavan Keosouliya / Naem Lattanabounmee / Neechapad Mapha / Namfonh Morladok / Aksonesavanh Philavong / Koy Xayavong / Nouandam Volabouth / Norkham Vongxay (LAO); L 0–3	3rd place, bronze medalist(s)	—N/a		
Chea Raksmei / Nuth Karona / Orm Vuoch Leang / Pho Panha / Un Sreynich / Vann Socheata	Quadrant	Manlika Bunthod / Wiphada Chitphuan / Masaya Duangsri / Sirinan Khiaopak / Pruksa Maneewong / Somruedee Pruepruk (THA); L 0–2 (10–21, 4–21)	Madziatul Rosmahani Saidin / Nur Athirah Roslan / Nur Fatihah Sharudin / Nur Natasha Amyra Fazil / Razmah Adam / Siti Norzubaidah Wahab (MAS); L 0–2 (14–21, 18–21)	—N/a		3rd	Did not advance		

Athlete	Event	Preliminary Round	Final Round	
Athlete	Event	Score	Score	Rank
Chea Raksmei; Nuth Karona; Orm Vuoch Leang; Pho Panha; San Sophorn; Un Sreynich	Hoop	290	230	3rd place, bronze medalist(s)

== Taekwondo ==
=== Kyorugi ===
Athlete	Event	Semifinals	Final	
Athlete	Event	Opposition Score	Opposition Score	Rank
Sam Youdeth	Men's 58 kg	Fu Cern Put Thai (MAS); W 2–0	Thanakrit Yodrak (THA); L 0–2	2nd place, silver medalist(s)
Mean Soursayik	Men's 68 kg	Arven Alcantara (PHI); L 0–2	Did not advance	3rd place, bronze medalist(s)
Va Mithona	Men's 74 kg	Jack Woody Mercer (THA); L 0–2	Did not advance	3rd place, bronze medalist(s)
Phou Soucheng	Men's 87 kg	Nicholas Armanto (INA); L 0–2	Did not advance	3rd place, bronze medalist(s)
Vann Rithy	Men's +87 kg	Bye	Kyaw Min Naing (MYA); L 1–2	2nd place, silver medalist(s)
Kry Lyden	Women's 49 kg	Thi Kim Tuyen Truong (VIE); L 0–2	Did not advance	3rd place, bronze medalist(s)
Mam Julie	Women's 53 kg	Megawati Tamesti Maheswari (INA); L 0–2	Did not advance	3rd place, bronze medalist(s)
Chhoeung Aliza	Women's 57 kg	Thi Dung Vu (VIE); W 2–0	Phannapa Harnsujin (THA); L 0–2	2nd place, silver medalist(s)
Sok Sreytoch	Women's 62 kg	Sasikarn Tongchan (THA); L 0–2	Did not advance	3rd place, bronze medalist(s)
Tubbs Casande Nicole	Women's 67 kg	Laila Rimbawa Delo (PHI); W 2–1	Thi Khiem Bac (VIE); W 2–0	1st place, gold medalist(s)
Cheang Bunna	Women's 73 kg	Kirstie Alora (PHI); L 0–2	Did not advance	3rd place, bronze medalist(s)
Sorn Seavmey	Women's +73 kg	Bye	Sirimanotham Sonesavnh (LAO); W 2–0	1st place, gold medalist(s)

=== Recognized Poomsae ===
Athlete	Event	Score	Rank
Chhorn Kimhak	Men's individual	7.36	3rd place, bronze medalist(s)
Mang Kanithyda	Women's individual	7.09	3rd place, bronze medalist(s)
Tuon Navut; Sem Sok Heang; Samnang Vanneth	Men's team	7.23	6th
Chhoeung Lyna; Mang Kanithyda; Voeun Sitha	Women's team	7.28	5th
Chhorn Kimhak; Nang Vannak	Mixed pair	7.33	5th

=== Freestyle Poomsae ===
Athlete	Event	Score	Rank
Keo Moni	Men's individual	6.54	4th
Voeun Sitha	Women's individual	6.18	2nd place, silver medalist(s)
Chon Sovan; Chhoeung Lyna; Keo Moni; Kang Langchhun; Nang Vannak	Mixed team	6.44	3rd place, bronze medalist(s)

== Teqball (Demonstration) ==
As a demonstration sport, medals won in teqball will not count towards Cambodia's official medal tally.

=== Men's event ===
Team	Event	Group Stage				Semifinals	Final / BM	
Team	Event	Opposition Score	Opposition Score	Opposition Score	Rank	Opposition Score	Opposition Score	Rank
Riem Sokphirom	Singles	Muhammed Abdul Harith (BRU); L 1–2	Marvin Escamillan (PHI); W 2–0	—N/a	1st	Al-Barilan Shaul Hameed (MAS); W 2–0	Yoga Ardika Putra (INA); W 2–1	1st place, gold medalist(s)
Hou Sambo	Singles	Al-Barilan Shaul Hameed (MAS); L 0–2	Mohamed Mohamed Farhan (SGP); L 0–2	Yoga Ardika Putra (INA); W 2–0	3rd	Did not advance		
Riem Sokphirom / Soun Ravi	Doubles	Abdul bin Saidin / Mohammed bin Jamaludin (BRU); W 2–0	Muhammed Faizal / Muhammed Fahrosh Khan (SGP); W 2–0	Benidiktus Budi Setyoko / Husni Uba (INA); L 0–2	2nd	Phakphon Dejaroen / Uthen Kukheaw (THA); L 0–2	Benidiktus Budi Setyoko / Husni Uba (INA); W 2–0	3rd place, bronze medalist(s)
Bun Thuonvireak / Ol Ravy	Doubles	Fernando Caoile / Marc Geulos Fuentes (PHI); W 2–1	Mustaqim bin Zainordin / Mohd Abdul Wahid (MAS); W 2–0	Phakphon Dejaroen / Uthean Kukheaw (THA); L 0–2	2nd	Benidiktus Budi Setyoko / Husni Uba (INA); W 2–1	Phakphon Dejaroen / Uthean Kukheaw (THA); L 0–2	2nd place, silver medalist(s)

=== Women's event ===
Team	Event	Group Stage					Semifinals	Final / BM	
Team	Event	Opposition Score	Opposition Score	Opposition Score	Opposition Score	Rank	Opposition Score	Opposition Score	Rank
Pich Sopha	Singles	Siti Bindi Zamri (MAS); L 0–2	Ngoun Chanboramey (CAM); L 0–2	Yunita Indria (INA); L 0–2	Sharifah Nur Amanina Shahab (SGP); L 0–2	5th	Did not advance		
Ngoun Chanboramey	Singles	Yunita Indria (INA); L 0–2	Pich Sopha (CAM); W 2–0	Sharifah Nur Amanina Shahab (SGP); L 0–2	Siti Asnidah Zamri (MAS); L 0–2	4th	Sharifah Nur Amanina Shahab (SGP); L 0–2	Siti Asnidah Zamri (MAS); L 0–2	4th
Yem Neardey / Youn Sophornraksmey	Doubles	Jutatip Kuntatong / Suphawadi Wongkhamchan (THA); L 0–2	Mey Sreymeas / Ngoun Chanboramey (CAM); W 2–1	—N/a		2nd	—N/a	Jutatip Kuntatong / Suphawadi Wongkhamchan (THA); L 0–2	2nd place, silver medalist(s)
Mey Sreymeas / Ngoun Chanboramey	Doubles	Jutatip Kuntatong / Suphawadi Wongkhamchan (THA); L 0–2	Yem Neardey / Youn Sophornraksmey (CAM); L 1–2	—N/a		3rd	—N/a	Did not advance	

=== Mixed's event ===
Team	Event	Final	
Team	Event	Opposition Score	Rank
Bun Thuonvireak; Soun Ravy	Doubles	Phakpong Dejaroen; Suphawadi Wongkhamchan (THA); L 0–2	2nd place, silver medalist(s)

== Volleyball ==
=== Beach ===
Team	Event	Preliminary round					Semifinals	Finals / BM	
Team	Event	Opposition Score	Opposition Score	Opposition Score	Opposition Score	Rank	Opposition Score	Opposition Score	Rank
Chuk Sophea; Ty Menghuong; Oem Narit; Pich Sophon	Men's tournament	Philippines; L 1-2	Vietnam; L 0-2	Laos; W 2-0	Timor-Leste; W 2-0	3	Did not advance		
Nancy Pin; Soun Brittany; Marineth Huffaker; Touch Sabrina Jinda	Women's tournament	Singapore; L 0-2	Indonesia; L 0-2	—N/a		3	Did not advance		

=== Indoor ===
Team	Event	Preliminary round				Semi Finals / PF	Finals / BM / PF	
Team	Event	Opposition Score	Opposition Score	Opposition Score	Rank	Opposition Score	Opposition Score	Rank
Cambodia men's	Men's tournament	Singapore; W 3–0	Philippines; W 3–0	Indonesia; L 0–3	2	Thailand; W 3–2	Indonesia; L 0–3	2nd place, silver medalist(s)
Cambodia women's	Women's tournament	Philippines; L 0–3	Singapore; L 0–3	Vietnam; L 0–3	4	Malaysia; L 0–3	Myanmar; L 0–3	8

== Weightlifting ==
=== Men ===
Athlete	Event	Snatch Result (Kg)	Clean & Jerk Result (Kg)	Total	Rank
Pich Seyha	55 kg	81	104	185	5th
Ny Chanthanun	67 kg	76	88	164	5th
Duch Bunroth	73 kg	98	121	219	4th
Yin Sokleng	81 kg	83	105	188	4th
Sorn Pou	+89 kg	100	117	217	4th

=== Women ===
Athlete	Event	Snatch Result (Kg)	Clean & Jerk Result (Kg)	Total	Rank
Seng Borin	45 kg	55	63	118	4th
Tan Poch	49 kg	50	58	108	5th
Try Sopheakreach	55 kg	36	47	83	3rd place, bronze medalist(s)
Roeun Sreynith	64 kg	55	69	124	4th

== Wrestling ==
=== Men's Greco-Roman ===
Athlete	Event	Pool Stage				
Athlete	Event	Opposition Score	Opposition Score	Opposition Score	Opposition Score	Rank
Thach Socheat	55 Kg	Dinh Huy Nguyen (VIE); L 0–4	Michael Sedano Carter (PHI); L 1–4	—N/a		3rd place, bronze medalist(s)
Yon Bunna	60 Kg	Bounthien Kommalaxa (LAO); W 4–0	Eddy Zulqarnain Khidzer (SGP); W 4–1	Tien Hai Bui (VIE); L 0–4	—N/a	2nd place, silver medalist(s)
Chray Pros	63 Kg	Nuttapong Hinmee (THA); L 1–4	Noel Negrosa Norada (PHI); L 1–4	Suparmanto Suparmanto (INA); L 0–4	—N/a	4th
Eng Phanit	67 Kg	Sihavong Dawson Stephen (LAO); L 0–5	Chovelle Van Adolfo (PHI); L 0–4	—N/a		3rd
Nguon Makara	72 Kg	Apichai Natal (THA); L 0–4	Cong Manh Nguyen (VIE); L 0–4	Jason Saltin Baucas (PHI); L 0–4	—N/a	4th
Chham Pisin	77 Kg	Ba Son Nguyen (VIE); L 0–5	Andika Sulaeman (INA); L 0–4	Gadiel Al-Qudrah Misso (SGP); W 4–0	Wisit Thamwirat (THA); L 0–4	4th
Keo Sophak	82 Kg	Aryan Bin Azman (SGP); L 0–5	Jason Casinto Balabal (PHI); L 0–4	—N/a		3rd place, bronze medalist(s)
Chhoeung Veasna	87 Kg	Lulut Gilang Saputra (INA); L 0–5	Dinh Hieu Ngheim (VIE); L 0–4	—N/a		3rd place, bronze medalist(s)
Mo Sari	97 Kg	Vansalong Phiathep (LAO); W 4–0	Atthaphol Sirithahan (THA); W 4–0	—N/a		1st place, gold medalist(s)
Sou Bali	130 Kg	Nanthawat Panphuek (THA); W 4–1	Yu Timothy Loh (SGP); W 4–0	—N/a		1st place, gold medalist(s)

=== Men's freestyle ===
Athlete	Event	Pool Stage					Semifinals	Final	
Athlete	Event	Opposition Score	Opposition Score	Opposition Score	Opposition Score	Rank	Opposition Score	Opposition Score	Rank
Soeun Sophors	61 Kg	Bounthien Kommalaxa (LAO); W 4–1	Zainal Abidin (INA); L 0–4	—N/a		2nd	Ronil Tubog (PHI); L 0–4	Siripong Jumpakam (THA); L 0–5	3rd place, bronze medalist(s)
Chon Thoun	65 Kg	Xuan Dinh Nguyen (VIE); L 0–4	Hamka Hamka (INA); L 0–4	—N/a		3rd	Did not advance		
Chhoeun Chheang	70 Kg	Mohamed Qayyam Abdullah (SGP); W 4–1	Ardiansyah Darmansyah (INA); W 3–0	—N/a		1st	Sihavong Dawson Stephen (LAO); L 1–4	Ardiansyah Darmansyah (INA); L 0–4	
Lim Sok Leang	74 Kg	Parinya Chamnanjan (THA); L 0–4	Tat Du Can (VIE); L 0–4	Hong Yeow Lou (SGP); L 0–4	Rachmat Hadi Wijaya (INA); L 1–3	5th	Did not advance		
Ol Saoheng	79 Kg	Weng Luen Gary Chow (SGP); L 0–5	Randa Riandesta (INA); L 0–5	—N/a		3rd place, bronze medalist(s)	—N/a		
Heng Vuthy	86 Kg	Chiranuwat Chamnanjan (THA); W 4–0	Thep Sitthison (LAO); W 5–0	Van Truong Vu Tran (VIE); W 3–0	—N/a	1st place, gold medalist(s)	—N/a		
Heng Rotha	92 Kg	Van Lim Ngo (VIE); L 0–4	Jefferson Manatad (PHI); L 0–4	—N/a		3rd place, bronze medalist(s)	—N/a		
Mo Sari	97 Kg	Chino Torres Sy (PHI); W 4–1	Asoem Thepphasouvanh (LAO); W 5–0	—N/a		1st place, gold medalist(s)	—N/a		
Dorn Sao	125 Kg	Yu Timothy Loh (SGP); L 0–5	Lerdxai Khamthama (LAO); W 4–0	—N/a		2nd place, silver medalist(s)	—N/a		

=== Women's freestyle ===
Athlete	Event	Pool Stage				
Athlete	Event	Opposition Score	Opposition Score	Opposition Score	Opposition Score	Rank
Dit Samnang	53 Kg	Hsiao Ping Alvina Lim (SGP); W 4–0	Mutiara Ayuningtias (INA); L 1–3	Nadia Narin (THA); L 0–5	Maribel Jambora Angana (PHI); W 5–0	3rd place, bronze medalist(s)
Sim Keatha	57 Kg	Danielle Sue Ching Lim (SGP); L 0–4	Thi My Trang Nguyen (VIE); L 0–5	—N/a		3rd place, bronze medalist(s)
Chhoeun Sreylen	62 Kg	Nguyen Thi My Hanh (VIE); L 0–4	Kharisma Tantri Herlina (INA); L 0–5	—N/a		3rd place, bronze medalist(s)
Sambat Vannak	65 Kg	Sopha Tammavong (LAO); W 4–0	Cristina Villanueva Vergara (PHI); L 1–4	—N/a		2nd place, silver medalist(s)
Soeurn Noeurn	68 Kg	Vanmixay Soulisa (LAO); W 5–0	Dieu Thuong Lai (VIE); L 0–5	—N/a		2nd place, silver medalist(s)
Chea Kanha	72 Kg	Jeanmae Guerra Lobo (PHI); W 5–0	Phonexai Paosavat (LAO); W 4–0	—N/a		1st place, gold medalist(s)

== Wushu ==
=== Sanda ===
Athlete	Event	Semifinals	Final	
Athlete	Event	Opposition Score	Opposition Score	Rank
Mao Muychantharith	Men's 56 kg	Huy Hoang Do (VIE); L 1–2	Did not advance	3rd place, bronze medalist(s)
Beng Rathana	Men's 65 kg	Samuel Marbun (INA); L 0–2	Did not advance	3rd place, bronze medalist(s)
Chhuon Bunthai	Men's 70 kg	Nay Win Htut (MYA); W 2–0	Van Bi Dinh (VIE); L 1–2	2nd place, silver medalist(s)
Sam Mary	Women's 45 kg	?	?	2nd place, silver medalist(s)
Phatt Dany	Women's 52 kg	?	?	3rd place, bronze medalist(s)

=== Taolu ===
Athlete	Event	Score	Rank
Hem Bot; Chea Dara; Ching Vireak	Men's Duilian	9.3160	2nd place, silver medalist(s)
Heng Veasna	Men's Nanquan	8.1830	9th
Mao Chanrayuth	Men's Nanquan	7.7500	10th
Rong Phiroun	Men's Changquan	8.1030	13th
Khan Kamut	Men's Changquan	7.4930	14th
Ching Vireak	Men's Taijiquan + Taijijian	17.7660	9th
Chan Dara	Men's Taijiquan + Taijijian	16.0090	11th
Chin Sros; Vy Sreyleak; Tin Bopha	Women's Duilian	9.4430	1st place, gold medalist(s)
Chin Sros	Women's Nanquan	DNS	
Tin Bopha	Women's Changquan	6.2500	10th
