= Kun Khmer at the 2023 SEA Games =

- Venue: Elephant Hall 1, Morodok Techo National Stadium
- Location: Phnom Penh, Cambodia
- Dates: 6–11 May 2023

Kun Khmer competitions at the 2023 SEA Games took place at Morodok Techo National Stadium, Phnom Penh. Kun Khmer or Pradal serey is an ancient Cambodian variation of Kick boxing, dating back to the Khmer Empire in the 9th century AD. A total of 19 medals were awarded.

The sport marked its debut at the SEA Games, however a similar sport named Muay Thai was contested in earlier editions. Thai athletes protested over the use of the term 'Kun Khmer' over 'Muay Thai'. The International Federation of Muaythai Associations boycotted the events and Thai athletes decided not to take part in the games under the name 'Kun Khmer'.

== Medal table ==
* Host nation (Cambodia)

Rank	Nation	Gold	Silver	Bronze	Total
1	Cambodia*	14	3	2	19
2	Vietnam	5	8	4	17
3	Laos	0	5	7	12
4	Myanmar	0	2	7	9
5	Philippines	0	1	5	6
6	Malaysia	0	0	5	5
Totals (6 entries)		19	19	30	68

== Medalists ==
=== Kun Kru ===
Event	Gold	Silver	Bronze
Men's Kun Kru	Meng Hong Kan; Cambodia	Khamlar Samavong; Laos	Athacai Saiphawat Kiang; Malaysia
Women's Kun Kru	Soeng Moeuy; Cambodia	Phạm Thị Bích Liểu; Vietnam	Sysoubanthong Manyvanh; Laos

=== Men ===
Event	Gold	Silver	Bronze
–45 kg	Mab Theara; Cambodia	Võ Nhuận Phong; Vietnam	Banxadeth Sybou; Laos
–48 kg	Phun Piseth; Cambodia	Dương Đức Bảo; Vietnam	Muhd Haris Haiqal Helmi; Malaysia
–51 kg	Kham Khalaneang; Cambodia	Lê Công Nghị; Vietnam	Tengku Muhd Adam Fakruzie; Malaysia
–51 kg	Kham Khalaneang; Cambodia	Lê Công Nghị; Vietnam	Somboun Banxadeth; Laos
–54 kg	Him Koemrieng; Cambodia	Soukna Keothatalath; Laos	Khuất Văn Khải; Vietnam
–54 kg	Him Koemrieng; Cambodia	Soukna Keothatalath; Laos	Hein Thu Aung; Myanmar
–57 kg	Khun Laingkousin; Cambodia	Kristian Salatan Narca; Philippines	Nguyễn Thanh Trung; Vietnam
–57 kg	Khun Laingkousin; Cambodia	Kristian Salatan Narca; Philippines	Saw Ah Tit; Myanmar
–60 kg	Chhut Vannthong; Cambodia	Attaxay Sihabout; Laos	Moises Lois Ilogon; Philippines
–60 kg	Chhut Vannthong; Cambodia	Attaxay Sihabout; Laos	Muhd Akashah Ramli; Malaysia
–63.5 kg	Khun Bora; Cambodia	Soubinh Banxadeth; Laos	Trương Cao Minh Phát; Vietnam
–63.5 kg	Khun Bora; Cambodia	Soubinh Banxadeth; Laos	Saw Hla Win Soe; Myanmar
–67 kg	Lao Chetra; Cambodia	Nguyễn Châu Đạt; Vietnam	Athachai Saiphawat Kiang; Malaysia
–67 kg	Lao Chetra; Cambodia	Nguyễn Châu Đạt; Vietnam	Felex Cantores; Philippines
–71 kg	Tit Sorphorn; Cambodia	Nguyễn Hồng Quân; Vietnam	Bounma Bouddala; Laos
–71 kg	Tit Sorphorn; Cambodia	Nguyễn Hồng Quân; Vietnam	Naing Ye Lin; Myanmar
–75 kg	Lao Chantrea; Cambodia	Nguyễn Thanh Tùng; Vietnam	Kyaw Lin Htet; Myanmar
–81 kg	Prom Samnang; Cambodia	Tun Tun Min; Myanmar	Nguyễn Văn Chiến; Vietnam

=== Women ===
Event	Gold	Silver	Bronze
–45 kg	Huỳnh Hà Hữu Hiếu; Vietnam	Sysoubanthong Manyvanh; Laos	Chha Chandeng; Cambodia
–48 kg	Tạ Thị Kim Yến; Vietnam	May Thazin Htoo; Myanmar	Sokry Konyka; Cambodia
–48 kg	Tạ Thị Kim Yến; Vietnam	May Thazin Htoo; Myanmar	Floryvic Montero; Philippines
–51 kg	Triệu Thị Phương Thúy; Vietnam	Soeng Moeuy; Cambodia	Mar Yie Nar; Myanmar
–51 kg	Triệu Thị Phương Thúy; Vietnam	Soeng Moeuy; Cambodia	Zyra Bon-as; Philippines
–54 kg	Touch Chanvotey; Cambodia	Nguyễn Thị Chiều; Vietnam	Songka Chanthavong; Laos
–54 kg	Touch Chanvotey; Cambodia	Nguyễn Thị Chiều; Vietnam	Jenelyn Olsim; Philippines
–57 kg	Bùi Yến Ly; Vietnam	Toun Sreyphin; Cambodia	Duangchay Thalengliep; Laos
–57 kg	Bùi Yến Ly; Vietnam	Toun Sreyphin; Cambodia	Ohmar Soe; Myanmar
–60 kg	Bàng Thị Mai; Vietnam	Sam Samnang; Cambodia	Khammai Lathsavong; Laos

== See also ==
- Kun Bokator at the 2023 SEA Games
