= Azman Abdullah =

Singaporean bodybuilder

Azman Bin Abdullah (born 17 June 1963) is a Singaporean bodybuilder.

== Career ==
In 1993, he became the first in Singapore to win a gold medal at the IOC-sanctioned World Games Bodybuilding Championships in the middleweight category, outmuscling 51 of the world's premier bodybuilders. He also won a gold medal at the World Bodybuilding Championships, the same year. His world-class performances won him the best Sportsman of the Year title (for 1993) for the second time. Won Mr. Universe in 1993. Winner of the Mr Singapore title on five occasions and the continent-elite Mr Asia five times from 1989 to 1993, he also scooped the prestigious Asian Pro-Am Classic in 1992, and was a multiple gold medal winner in the Southeast Asian Games in 1989, 1991 and in 1993.

In 1993, Azman became the first Singaporean to strike gold in the World Games Bodybuilding Championships. In that very same year, he also won gold in the World Bodybuilding Championships in the middleweight class to become Singapore's first ever IFBB Mr Universe after taking silver the previous year.

He was awarded the Singapore Sports Council's Sportsman of the Year title twice in 1992 and 1993, and an induction into the Singapore Sports Council's Hall of Fame.

In 1993, Azman was awarded the Public Service Medal.

In 1994, Azman turned professional after receiving his card from the International Federation of Bodybuilders.
