= Endurance race at the 2023 SEA Games =

Duathlon/Triathlon/Aquathlon at the 2023 SEA Games
- Location: Kep Beach, Cambodia
- Dates: 6–8 May 2023

Endurance race at the 2023 SEA Games were held at Kep Beach from 6 to 8 May 2023. The game consisted three events, duathlon, triathlon, and aquathlon. And total 7 medals were awarded.

== Medal table ==
* Host nation (Cambodia)

| Rank | Nation | Gold | Silver | Bronze | Total |
|---|---|---|---|---|---|
| 1 | Philippines | 3 | 2 | 1 | 6 |
| 2 | Cambodia* | 2 | 1 | 0 | 3 |
| 3 | Indonesia | 1 | 2 | 3 | 6 |
| 4 | Vietnam | 1 | 1 | 1 | 3 |
| 5 | Thailand | 0 | 1 | 0 | 1 |
| 6 | Singapore | 0 | 0 | 2 | 2 |
| Totals (6 entries) | | 7 | 7 | 7 | 21 |

== Medal summary ==
=== Aquathlon ===
| Event | Gold | Silver | Bronze |
|---|---|---|---|
| Men's individual | Rashif Amila Yaqin; Indonesia | Andrew Kim Remolino; Philippines | Bryce Sheng Cher Chong; Singapore |
| Women's individual | Margot Garabedian; Cambodia | Aisika Kaewyongkod; Thailand | Dea Salsabila Putri; Indonesia |
| Mixed team relay | Philippines; Matthew Hermosa; Kira Ellis; Erica Burgos; Inaki Lorbes | Indonesia; Aloysius Reckyardo Mardian; Renata Berliana Aditya; Aryandra Fauzi Mauludin; Dea Salsabila Putri | Vietnam; Vũ Đình Duân; Nguyễn Hoàng Dung; Nguyễn Thị Kim Tuyến; Hoàng Văn Hải |

=== Duathlon ===
| Event | Gold | Silver | Bronze |
|---|---|---|---|
| Men's individual | Phạm Tiến Sản; Vietnam | Sokha Michael Chaumond; Cambodia | Sedilta Pilon Nubatonis; Indonesia |
| Women's individual | Kim Mangrobang; Philippines | Nguyễn Thị Phương Trinh; Vietnam | Maharani Azhri Wahyuningtyas; Indonesia |

=== Triathlon ===
| Event | Gold | Silver | Bronze |
|---|---|---|---|
| Men's individual | Fernando Jose Casares; Philippines | Rashif Amila Yaqin; Indonesia | Andrew Kim Remolino; Philippines |
| Women's individual | Margot Garabedian; Cambodia | Kim Mangrobang; Philippines | Louisa Marie Middleditch; Singapore |
