= Pétanque at the 2023 SEA Games =

- Venue: Pétanque Arena, Olympic Sports Complex
- Location: Phnom Penh, Cambodia
- Dates: 6–13 May 2023

Pétanque competitions at the 2023 SEA Games took place at Pétanque Arena of Olympic Sports Complex, Phnom Penh.

== Medal table ==
* Host nation (Cambodia)

Rank	Nation	Gold	Silver	Bronze	Total
1	Thailand	6	0	5	11
2	Laos	3	2	4	9
3	Malaysia	1	1	3	5
4	Myanmar	1	0	0	1
5	Cambodia*	0	6	4	10
6	Vietnam	0	2	5	7
7	Philippines	0	0	1	1
Totals (7 entries)		11	11	22	44

== Medalists ==
Event	Gold	Silver	Bronze
Men's shooting	Phoudthala Keokannika; Laos	Thong Chhoeun; Cambodia	Supan Thongphoo; Thailand
Men's shooting	Phoudthala Keokannika; Laos	Thong Chhoeun; Cambodia	Nguyễn Văn Dũng; Vietnam
Men's singles	Saiful Bahri Musmin; Malaysia	Bountamy Southammavong; Laos	Akkrachai Meekhong; Thailand
Men's singles	Saiful Bahri Musmin; Malaysia	Bountamy Southammavong; Laos	Sok Chanmean; Cambodia
Men's doubles	Thailand; Aekkarin Kaewla; Ratchata Khamdee	Cambodia; Pheap Vakhim; Puth Yon Chandara	Vietnam; Ngô Ron; Danh Sà Phanl
Men's doubles	Thailand; Aekkarin Kaewla; Ratchata Khamdee	Cambodia; Pheap Vakhim; Puth Yon Chandara	Malaysia; Mohd Fadzrul Ismansyah Faizal; Muhd Adam Haiqal Zaki
Men's triples	Thailand; Chareonwit Ketsattaban; Anuphon Phathan; Thawonsith Ratchakot; Thanakorn Sangkaew	Cambodia; Born Sidaet; Heng Than; Koy Sopheaktra; Tep Nora	Laos; Phoutsana Lanvongheng; Khalouy Phetvaly; Khenthong Ounnalom; Maisanh Viphakon
Men's triples	Thailand; Chareonwit Ketsattaban; Anuphon Phathan; Thawonsith Ratchakot; Thanakorn Sangkaew	Cambodia; Born Sidaet; Heng Than; Koy Sopheaktra; Tep Nora	Vietnam; Huỳnh Phước Nguyên; Huỳnh Thiên Ân; Thạch Tuấn Thanh; Võ Minh Luân
Women's shooting	Khin Cherry Thet; Myanmar	Nguyễn Thị Thi; Vietnam	Rodsukhon Thongthanom; Thailand
Women's shooting	Khin Cherry Thet; Myanmar	Nguyễn Thị Thi; Vietnam	Oum Davin; Cambodia
Women's singles	Sirion Sarachip; Thailand	Thái Thị Hồng Thoa; Vietnam	Souksada Silichanh; Laos
Women's singles	Sirion Sarachip; Thailand	Thái Thị Hồng Thoa; Vietnam	Nur Durratul Iffah Yazit; Malaysia
Women's doubles	Laos; Aly Sengchanphet; Chindavone Sisavath	Cambodia; Thea Samphors; Thyvann Chhum	Thailand; Thongsri Thamakord; Phantipha Wongchuvej
Women's doubles	Laos; Aly Sengchanphet; Chindavone Sisavath	Cambodia; Thea Samphors; Thyvann Chhum	Philippines; April Alarcon; Maria Corazon Soberre
Women's triples	Thailand; Lalita Chiaochan; Kantaros Choochuay; Panadda Jandung; Aumpawan Suwannaphruk	Laos; Kaithong Keophila; Noneny Phanthaly; Aly Sengchanphet; Boutsady Sengmany; Pinmany Vongsee	Cambodia; Duong Dina; Khoun Yary; Ouk Sreymom; Sreng Sorakhim
Women's triples	Thailand; Lalita Chiaochan; Kantaros Choochuay; Panadda Jandung; Aumpawan Suwannaphruk	Laos; Kaithong Keophila; Noneny Phanthaly; Aly Sengchanphet; Boutsady Sengmany; Pinmany Vongsee	Vietnam; Nguyễn Thị Cẩm Duyên; Nguyễn Thị Lan; Trần Thị Diễm Trang; Trịnh Thị Kim Thanh
Mixed doubles	Thailand; Nantawan Fueangsanit; Sarawut Sriboonpeng	Cambodia; Nop Chourlyka; Sao Sophearann	Laos; Tingxanh Keokannika; Noy Manythone
Mixed doubles	Thailand; Nantawan Fueangsanit; Sarawut Sriboonpeng	Cambodia; Nop Chourlyka; Sao Sophearann	Vietnam; Huỳnh Công Tâm; Nguyễn Thị Thúy Kiều
Mixed triples (2 men and 1 woman)	Laos; Nidavanh Douangmanichanh; Vilasack Lathsavong; Somsamay Xamounty	Cambodia; Sin Vong; Vorng Chantha; Yim Sophorn	Malaysia; Akhtar Shauqi Aini Dom; Amirol Mukminin Dali; Jasnina Jasmine Johan Johnson
Mixed triples (2 men and 1 woman)	Laos; Nidavanh Douangmanichanh; Vilasack Lathsavong; Somsamay Xamounty	Cambodia; Sin Vong; Vorng Chantha; Yim Sophorn	Thailand; Phongsakorn Ainpu; Piyamart Prapassorn; Panukorn Roeksanit
Mixed triples (2 women and 1 man)	Thailand; Anupong Khamfu; Sudarat Tasorn; Nattaya Yoothong	Malaysia; Mohd Muiz Ezham Mohd Rizan; Nur Thahira Tasnim Abdul Aziz; Sharifah Afiqah Farzana Syed Ali	Cambodia; Keo Sovanna; Sieng Vanna; Vann Monika
Mixed triples (2 women and 1 man)	Thailand; Anupong Khamfu; Sudarat Tasorn; Nattaya Yoothong	Malaysia; Mohd Muiz Ezham Mohd Rizan; Nur Thahira Tasnim Abdul Aziz; Sharifah Afiqah Farzana Syed Ali	Laos; Lar Mienmany; Manivanh Souliya; Bovilak Thepphakan
