= Kun Bokator at the 2023 SEA Games =

- Venue: Hall C, Changvar Convention Centre
- Location: Phnom Penh, Cambodia
- Date: 4–8 May 2023

The Kun Bokator competition at the 2023 SEA Games, with 21 events, took place at Hall C, Changvar Convention Centre, Phnom Penh, Cambodia from 4-8 May 2023. The sport marked its debut at the SEA Games. Kun Bokator is a Khmer martial art dating back two millennia and a UNESCO Intangible Cultural Heritage.

== Medal table ==
* Host nation (Cambodia)

Rank	Nation	Gold	Silver	Bronze	Total
1	Cambodia*	8	8	3	19
2	Vietnam	6	0	3	9
3	Indonesia	3	5	12	20
4	Philippines	2	6	8	16
5	Myanmar	1	2	6	9
6	Laos	1	0	10	11
Totals (6 entries)		21	21	42	84

== Medalists ==
=== Men ===
Event	Gold	Silver	Bronze
Combat 50 kg	Robin Sornito Catalan; Philippines	Ade Permana; Indonesia	Nguyễn Quang Luân; Vietnam
Combat 50 kg	Robin Sornito Catalan; Philippines	Ade Permana; Indonesia	Sovan Nang; Cambodia
Combat 55 kg	Nget Deb; Cambodia	Ariel Lee Biadno Lampacan; Philippines	Obaja Halomoan Sianturi; Indonesia
Combat 55 kg	Nget Deb; Cambodia	Ariel Lee Biadno Lampacan; Philippines	Hoàng Phúc Thuận; Vietnam
Combat 60 kg	Chet Chon; Cambodia	Kamal Maulansyah; Indonesia	Đặng Văn Thắng; Vietnam
Combat 60 kg	Chet Chon; Cambodia	Kamal Maulansyah; Indonesia	Phillip Delarmino; Philippines
Combat 65 kg	Huỳnh Văn Cường; Vietnam	Yudi Cahyadi; Indonesia	Ryan Tarang Jakiri; Philippines
Combat 65 kg	Huỳnh Văn Cường; Vietnam	Yudi Cahyadi; Indonesia	Latsasak Souliyavong; Laos
Combat 70 kg	Ngô Đức Mạnh; Vietnam	Damsoumphone Khieosavath; Laos	Samuel Frekson Wouw; Indonesia
Combat 70 kg	Ngô Đức Mạnh; Vietnam	Damsoumphone Khieosavath; Laos	Godwin Amos Langbayan; Philippines
Single Bare Hands Form	Kongngern Inthisarn; Laos	Pech Pon Ler; Cambodia	Dzaky Fadhlurrohman; Indonesia
Single Bare Hands Form	Kongngern Inthisarn; Laos	Pech Pon Ler; Cambodia	Khant Loon Zaw; Myanmar
Single Bamboo Shield Form	Kim Titsovathanak; Cambodia	Mark James Lacao; Philippines	Gema Nur Arifin; Indonesia
Single Bamboo Shield Form	Kim Titsovathanak; Cambodia	Mark James Lacao; Philippines	Annaosone Vannalatha; Laos
Single Bokator Spirit Form	Punleu Pichmorakoth; Cambodia	Alfadhila Ramadhan; Indonesia	Hlaing Chit Oo; Myanmar
Single Bokator Spirit Form	Punleu Pichmorakoth; Cambodia	Alfadhila Ramadhan; Indonesia	Nalongkone Suttivanna; Laos
Single Phkak Form	Ey Sam Oun; Cambodia	Yazid Hanifam Kurniawan; Indonesia	Antt Bwere Nyein; Myanmar
Single Phkak Form	Ey Sam Oun; Cambodia	Yazid Hanifam Kurniawan; Indonesia	Philavanh Chanthakaly; Laos
Duo Performance (Pair)	Indonesia; Gema Nur Arifin; Yazid Hanifam Kurniawan	Cambodia; Kim Titsovathanak; Yim Vutha	Laos; Khamkak Sivongxay; Kittizin Inthavong
Duo Performance (Pair)	Indonesia; Gema Nur Arifin; Yazid Hanifam Kurniawan	Cambodia; Kim Titsovathanak; Yim Vutha	Myanmar; Aung Pyae Sone; Khant Loon Zaw
Team Bare Hands Form (Team/Trio)	Indonesia; Tedi Hidayat; Sendiagi Putra; Moch Martin Ramadhan	Cambodia; Pech Pon Ler; Ok Riththeany; Yim Vutha	Laos; Aidin Sitthinoy; Sommay Phangnivong; Thongkhoun Vongphakdy
Team Bare Hands Form (Team/Trio)	Indonesia; Tedi Hidayat; Sendiagi Putra; Moch Martin Ramadhan	Cambodia; Pech Pon Ler; Ok Riththeany; Yim Vutha	Philippines; James Al Mayagma; Rick Luarez Ortega; Zandro Fred Cruz Jizmundo

=== Women ===
Event	Gold	Silver	Bronze
Combat 45 kg	Phạm Thị Phượng; Vietnam	Leang Sreynith; Cambodia	Rhichein Yosorez; Philippines
Combat 45 kg	Phạm Thị Phượng; Vietnam	Leang Sreynith; Cambodia	Miftahul Jannah; Indonesia
Combat 50 kg	Nguyễn Thị Thanh Tiền; Vietnam	Alyssa Mallari; Philippines	Sok Bunheourn; Cambodia
Combat 50 kg	Nguyễn Thị Thanh Tiền; Vietnam	Alyssa Mallari; Philippines	Diana Ratna Dewi; Indonesia
Combat 55 kg	Nguyễn Thị Tuyết Mai; Vietnam	Mariane Bantasan Mariano; Philippines	Sok Samphors; Cambodia
Combat 55 kg	Nguyễn Thị Tuyết Mai; Vietnam	Mariane Bantasan Mariano; Philippines	Selviah Pertiwi; Indonesia
Combat 60 kg	Trần Võ Song Thương; Vietnam	Meri Bulaong; Philippines	Jom Thitphavong; Laos
Combat 60 kg	Trần Võ Song Thương; Vietnam	Meri Bulaong; Philippines	Maylen Christy Aupe; Indonesia
Single Bare Hands Form	Yuos Sanchana; Cambodia	Rhichein Yosorez; Philippines	Somvang Maneesang; Laos
Single Bare Hands Form	Yuos Sanchana; Cambodia	Rhichein Yosorez; Philippines	Dwi Jayanti; Indonesia
Single Bamboo Shield Form	Angel Guen Alcances Derla; Philippines	Puth Chanchhorvy; Cambodia	Daslya Anggraini; Indonesia
Single Bamboo Shield Form	Angel Guen Alcances Derla; Philippines	Puth Chanchhorvy; Cambodia	Myat Noe Wai; Myanmar
Single Bokator Spirit Form	Mao Leakena; Cambodia	Nilar Soe Oo; Myanmar	Alyssa Mallari; Philippines
Single Bokator Spirit Form	Mao Leakena; Cambodia	Nilar Soe Oo; Myanmar	Riana Oktavia; Indonesia
Single Phkak Form	Sin Sivesien; Cambodia	Thein Gi Win Kyaw; Myanmar	Mitz Jude Lagura Jalandoni; Philippines
Single Phkak Form	Sin Sivesien; Cambodia	Thein Gi Win Kyaw; Myanmar	Inthila Boutsingkham; Laos
Team Bare Hands Form (Team/Trio)	Indonesia; Riana Oktavia; Riva Hijriah; Eny Tri Susilowati	Cambodia; Puth Chanchhorvy; Sen Safira; Yuos Sanhchana	Philippines; Angel Gwen Alcances Derla; Jessa Pitulan Dela Cruz; Shara Julia David Jizmundo
Team Bare Hands Form (Team/Trio)	Indonesia; Riana Oktavia; Riva Hijriah; Eny Tri Susilowati	Cambodia; Puth Chanchhorvy; Sen Safira; Yuos Sanhchana	Myanmar; Myat Noe Wai; Thein Gi Win Kyaw; Wutt Yee Oo

=== Mixed ===
Event	Gold	Silver	Bronze
1 Women Against 2 Men (Team)	Myanmar; Antt Bwere Nyein; Nilar Soe Oo; Paing Zayar Phyo	Cambodia; Ey Sam Oun; Punleu Pichmorakoth; Sen Safira	Laos; Daokham Bouapha; Khamser Va; Koneta Chanheuangseng
1 Women Against 2 Men (Team)	Myanmar; Antt Bwere Nyein; Nilar Soe Oo; Paing Zayar Phyo	Cambodia; Ey Sam Oun; Punleu Pichmorakoth; Sen Safira	Indonesia; Deslya Anggraini; Moch Martin Ramadhan; Sendiagi Putra

== Results ==
=== Men ===
Single Bamboo Shield Form
Athlete	Rank
Kim Titsovathanak (CAM)	8.25
Mark James Lacao (PHI)	7.75
Gema Nur Arifin (INA)	7.67
Annaosone Vannalatha (LAO)	7.42
Si Thu (MYA)	7.33

Single Bare Hands Form
Athlete	Rank
Kongngern Inthisarn (LAO)	7.83
Pech Pon Ler (CAM)	7.82
Dzaky Fadhlurrohman (INA)	7.50
Khant Loon Zaw (MYA)	7.08
Rick Rod Luarez Ortega (PHI)	6.83

Single Bokator Spirit Form
Athlete	Rank
Punleu Pichmorakoth (CAM)	7.99
Alfadhila Ramadhan (INA)	7.66
Hlaing Chit Oo (MYA)	7.33
Nalongkone Suttivanna (LAO)	6.83
Zandro Fred Cruz Jizmundo (PHI)	6.74

=== Women ===
Single Bamboo Shield Form
Athlete	Rank
Angel Guen Alcances Derla (PHI)	8.50
Puth Chanchhorvy (CAM)	8.47
Daslya Anggraini (INA)	8.42
Myat Noe Wai (MYA)	7.42
Phone Sonesaisane (LAO)	7.33

Single Bare Hands Form
Athlete	Rank
Yuos Sanchana (CAM)	7.74
Rhichein Yosorez (PHI)	7.33
Somvang Maneesang (LAO)	6.91
Dwi Jayanti (INA)	6.83
With Yee Oo (MYA)	6.74

Single Bokator Spirit Form
Athlete	Rank
Mao Leakena (CAM)	8.75
Nilar Soe Oo (MYA)	8.33
Riana Oktavia (INA)	8.08 (1.36)
Alyssa Kylie Mahinay Mallari (PHI)	8.08 (1.54)
Kounking Boudaxay (LAO)	7.83

== See also ==
- Kun Khmer at the 2023 SEA Games
