= Vera Tan =

Singaporean wushu practitioner (born 1998)

Personal information
- Born: 16 March 1998 (age 28) Singapore

Sport
- Sport: Wushu
- Events: Taijiquan, Taijijian, Duilian
Medal record
Women's wushu taolu
Representing Singapore
World Games
Bronze medal – third place	2022 Birmingham	Taijiquan+Taijijian
World Championships
Bronze medal – third place	2023 Fort Worth	Taijijian
World Cup
Bronze medal – third place	2018 Yangon	Taijiquan
World Taijiquan Championships
Gold medal – first place	2016 Warsaw	Optional Taijiquan
Gold medal – first place	2024 Singapore	Optional Taijijian
Gold medal – first place	2024 Singapore	New Yang Style Taijiquan
Bronze medal – third place	2024 Singapore	Optional Taijiquan
SEA Games
Gold medal – first place	2013 Naypyidaw	Duilian
Gold medal – first place	2015 Singapore	Compusory Taijijian
Asian Championships
Bronze medal – third place	2024 Macau	Taijiquan

Vera Tan Yan Ning (born 16 March 1998) is a Singaporean wushu taolu athlete who specializes in taijiquan, taijijian and duilian.

== Career ==
At the 2013 SEA Games, Tan won the gold medal in duilian discipline with her partner Valerie Wee Ling En. At the 2015 SEA Games, she won the gold medal in compulsory taijijian. Tan competed in the 2016 World Taijiquan Championships, where she won the gold medal in Optional Taijiquan.

At the 2022 World Games in Birmingham in the United States, Tan won the bronze medal in taijiquan & taijijian.

Tan competed in the 2023 World Combat Games, where she finished in fifth place in the taolu all-round. She then competed in the 2023 World Wushu Championships in Fort Worth, United States, where she won the bronze medal.

In August 2024, Tan competed in the World Taijiquan Championships, where she won the gold medal in Optional Taijijian and New Yang Style Taijiquan as well as the bronze medal in Optional Taijiquan. The following month, she competed in the 2024 Asian Wushu Championships where she won a bronze medal in taijiquan.

== Personal life ==
Tan married fellow wushu practitioner Jowen Lim on 28 December 2024.
