= Jujitsu at the 2023 SEA Games =

Martial Arts Competitions

- Venue: Chroy Changvar Convention Centre
- Location: Phnom Penh, Cambodia
- Dates: 4–7 May 2023

Jujitsu competitions at the 2023 SEA Games took place at Hall B, Chroy Changvar Convention Centre in Phnom Penh, Cambodia. Total 13 events were contested from 4 to 7 May 2023.

== Medal table ==
* Host nation (Cambodia)

Rank	Nation	Gold	Silver	Bronze	Total
1	Thailand	6	2	5	13
2	Cambodia*	3	5	1	9
3	Philippines	3	1	8	12
4	Vietnam	1	2	9	12
5	Singapore	1	1	2	4
6	Laos	0	1	0	1
7	Malaysia	0	0	1	1
Totals (7 entries)		14	12	26	52

== Medalists ==
=== Art ===
Event	Gold	Silver	Bronze
Men's Duo	Cambodia; Kongmona Mithora; Touch Pikada	Thailand; Nawin Kokaew; Panuwat Deeyatam	Philippines; Jan Harvey Navarro; Karl Dale Navarro
Men's Duo	Cambodia; Kongmona Mithora; Touch Pikada	Thailand; Nawin Kokaew; Panuwat Deeyatam	Vietnam; Ma Đình Khải; Trịnh Kế Dương
Men's Show	Cambodia; Kongmona Mithora; Touch Pikada	—	Philippines; Jayson Cayabyab Cayari; Raymond Percival Reyes Villaraza
Men's Show	Thailand; Charatchai Kitpongsri; Warut Netpong	—	Vietnam; Phan Hữu Thắng; Nguyễn Văn Đức
Women's Duo	Thailand; Kanyarat Phaophan; Panyaporn Phaophan	Cambodia; Heng Seavheang; Tin Sovanlina	Vietnam; Nguyễn Minh Phương; Hoàng Thị Lan Hương
Women's Duo	Thailand; Kanyarat Phaophan; Panyaporn Phaophan	Cambodia; Heng Seavheang; Tin Sovanlina	Philippines; Andrea Camille Manalo Divina; Louann Jindani Gutierrez
Women's Show	Thailand; Kunsatri Kumsroi; Suphawadee Kaeosrasaen	Cambodia; Heng Seavheang; Tin Sovanlina	Philippines; Dianne Ruado Bargo; Isabela Dominique Montaña
Women's Show	Thailand; Kunsatri Kumsroi; Suphawadee Kaeosrasaen	Cambodia; Heng Seavheang; Tin Sovanlina	Vietnam; Nguyễn Minh Phương; Hoàng Thị Lan Hương
Mixed Duo	Thailand; Lalita Yuennan; Warawut Saengsriruang	Cambodia; Heng Seavheang; Kongmona Mithora	Vietnam; Sái Công Nguyên; Lương Ngọc Trà
Mixed Duo	Thailand; Lalita Yuennan; Warawut Saengsriruang	Cambodia; Heng Seavheang; Kongmona Mithora	Philippines; Christopher Medina Gallego; Estie Gay Dulnuan Liwanen
Mixed Show	Thailand; Areewan Chansri; Ratcharat Yimprai	Cambodia; Sor Sophanuth; Tin Sovanlina	Philippines; Ian Patrick Baluyut Gurrobat; Leslygomez Romero
Mixed Show	Thailand; Areewan Chansri; Ratcharat Yimprai	Cambodia; Sor Sophanuth; Tin Sovanlina	Vietnam; Trịnh Kế Dương; Lương Ngọc Trà

=== Combat ===
Event	Gold	Silver	Bronze
Men's ne-waza gi 62 kg	Suwijak Kuntong; Thailand	Cấn Văn Thắng; Vietnam	Amirul Syafiq Bin Shah Eran; Singapore
Men's ne-waza gi 62 kg	Suwijak Kuntong; Thailand	Cấn Văn Thắng; Vietnam	Myron Myles Medina Mangubat; Philippines
Men's ne-waza gi 69 kg	Noah Lim; Singapore	Jedidah Phomsavath Slayman; Laos	Hour Senghong; Cambodia
Men's ne-waza gi 69 kg	Noah Lim; Singapore	Jedidah Phomsavath Slayman; Laos	Adam Akaksyah; Malaysia
Men's ne-waza nogi 56 kg	Đào Hồng Sơn; Vietnam	Tang Yong Siang; Singapore	Jan Vincent Ferrer Cortez; Philippines
Men's ne-waza nogi 56 kg	Đào Hồng Sơn; Vietnam	Tang Yong Siang; Singapore	Komkrit Keadnin; Thailand
Men's ne-waza nogi 69 kg	Marc Alexander Foronda Lim; Philippines	Đặng Đình Tùng; Vietnam	Noah Lim; Singapore
Men's ne-waza nogi 69 kg	Marc Alexander Foronda Lim; Philippines	Đặng Đình Tùng; Vietnam	Kunnapong Hasdee; Thailand
Women's ne-waza gi 52 kg	Jenna Kaila Napolis; Philippines	Jessa Khan; Cambodia	Nuchanat Singchalad; Thailand
Women's ne-waza gi 52 kg	Jenna Kaila Napolis; Philippines	Jessa Khan; Cambodia	Đặng Thị Huyền; Vietnam
Women's ne-waza nogi 52 kg	Jessa Khan; Cambodia	Meggie Ochoa; Philippines	Benyatip Phumthong; Thailand
Women's ne-waza nogi 52 kg	Jessa Khan; Cambodia	Meggie Ochoa; Philippines	Phùng Thị Huệ; Vietnam
Women's ne-waza nogi 57 kg	Annie Ramirez; Philippines	Orapa Senatham; Thailand	Lê Thị Thương; Vietnam
Women's ne-waza nogi 57 kg	Annie Ramirez; Philippines	Orapa Senatham; Thailand	Mab Sokhouy; Cambodia

== Results ==
=== Men ===
Show

NOC	Score	Rank
Thailand	46.5	1st place, gold medalist(s)
Cambodia	46	2nd place, silver medalist(s)
Philippines	41	3rd place, bronze medalist(s)
Vietnam	40.5	3rd place, bronze medalist(s)

Duo

Team	Pld	W	L	D	P
Cambodia	3	3	0	0	3
Thailand	3	2	1	0	2
Vietnam	3	1	2	0	1
Philippines	3	0	3	0	0

Ne-waza gi - 62 kg

Ne-waza gi - 69 kg

1/8 finals		1/4 finals		Final
		Hour Senghong (CAM)	0
Jedidah Phomsavath Slayman (LAO)	4	Jedidah Phomsavath Slayman (LAO)	50
Michael Espinosa Tiu (PHI)	2			Noah Tian Run Lim (SGP)	50
Huu Kang Nguyen (VIE)	0			Jedidah Phomsavath Slayman (LAO)	0
Noah Tian Run Lim (SGP)	50	Noah Tian Run Lim (SGP)	4
Sukitpeerarat Jantanakha (THA)	0	Adamn Akaksyah (MAS)	0
Adamn Akaksyah (MAS)	5

Bronze medals
Michael Espinosa Tiu (PHI)
Hour Senghong (CAM)

Bronze medals
Huu Kang Nguyen (VIE)
Adamn Akaksyah (MAS)

=== Women ===
Show

NOC	Score	Rank
Thailand	48	1st place, gold medalist(s)
Cambodia	42.5	2nd place, silver medalist(s)
Philippines	40	3rd place, bronze medalist(s)
Vietnam	40	3rd place, bronze medalist(s)

Duo

Ne-waza gi - 52 kg

Team	Pld	W	L	D	P
Philippines	4	4	0	0	4
Cambodia	4	3	1	0	3
Thailand	4	2	2	0	2
Vietnam	4	1	3	0	1
Singapore	4	0	4	0	0

Ne-waza nogi - 57 kg
