= Kongmona Mithora =

Cambodian jujitsu athlete

Personal information
- Native name: គង់មូណា មិថុរ៉ា
- Full name: Kongmona Mithora
- Nationality: Cambodian
- Home town: Phnom Penh, Cambodia

Sport
- Country: Cambodia
- Sport: Jujitsu
Medal record
Representing Cambodia
SEA Games
Gold medal – first place	2023 Cambodia	Men's Duo
Gold medal – first place	2023 Cambodia	Men's Show
Silver medal – second place	2023 Cambodia	Mixed Duo

Kongmona Mithora (Khmer: គង់មូណា មិថុរ៉ា) is a Cambodian jujitsu athlete. He won two gold medals and a silver at the 2023 SEA Games.

== Career ==
He participated in the 2023 JJIF Ju-Jitsu Asian Championship. He and Touch Pikada won a bronze medal in the men’s doubles event, show male.

At the 2023 SEA Games, he won the gold medal in the men's duo event alongside his teammate, Touch Pikada, and become the first gold medalist in the 2023 SEA Games. He won another gold medal with his teammate again after the match tied against Thailand's Charatchai Kitpongsri and Warut Netpong in the men's show, and a silver medal in the mixed duo alongside Heng Seavheang.
