= Kim Titsovathanak =

Kun bokator

Personal information
- Native name: គីម ទិត្យសុវឌ្ឍនៈ
- Full name: Kim Titsovathanak
- Nationality: Cambodian

Sport
- Country: Cambodia
- Sport: Bokator
Medal record
Representing Cambodia
Kun bokator
Southeast Asian Games
Gold medal – first place	2023 Cambodia	Single Bamboo Shield Form
Silver medal – second place	2023 Cambodia	Duo Performance (Pair)

Kim Titsovathanak (Khmer: គីម ទិត្យសុវឌ្ឍនៈ) is a kun bokator practitioner. He represented Cambodia in the kun bokator competition at the 2023 SEA Games.

== Personal life ==
Tithsovathanak is the son of former footballer Hok Sochetra and the grandson of Kun Bokator master Hok Chheang Kim.

== Careers ==
He started learning the Cambodian traditional martial art Kun Bokator since he was young and appeared on the first Cambodia's National Games in 2016. He participated in the International Martial Art Contests 2022, which was held in Cheongju, South Korea, and won a silver medal in Bare Hands Duo. He won a gold medal in Kun Bokator's Single Bamboo Shield Form event and a silver medal in Duo Performance at the 2023 SEA Games.

== Honours ==
Kun Bokator
Southeast Asian Games
Year	Place	Medal	Event
2023	(Cambodia) Phnom Penh	Gold	Single Bamboo Shield Form
2023	(Cambodia) Phnom Penh	Silver	Duo Performance (Pair)
