= Muhammad Iqbal Abdul Rahman =

Singapore Athlete

- Born: Singapore
- Style: Pencak silat

Muhammad Iqbal Abdul Rahman is a Singaporean Pencak Silat exponent who has won the gold medal at 2018 World Pencak Silat Championships and the 2021 Southeast Asian Games. He specialises in the "Singles (Tunggal) category". He is notable for winning Singapore's first gold medal at the 31st SEA Games 2021, held in Hanoi, Vietnam. He has won the world championship title at the 18th World Pencak Silat Championship 2018 in Singapore. He is also a 4 times Asian Championship gold medalist.

== Awards ==
International Results
| Year | Games | Venue | Event | Result |
|---|---|---|---|---|
| 2015 | SEA Games | Singapore | Singles | Bronze (bronze) |
| 2015 | World Championship | Phuket, Thailand | Singles | Bronze (bronze) |
| 2016 | World Championship | Denpasar, Indonesia | Singles | Silver (silver) |
| 2018 | World Championship | Singapore | Singles | Gold (gold) |
| 2019 | SEA Games | Olongapo, Philippines | Singles | Silver (silver) |
| 2019 | Asian Pencak Silat Championship | Yanji, China | Singles | Gold (gold) |
| 2019 | Asian Pencak Silat Championship | Yanji, China | Team | Gold (gold) |
| 2021 | SEA Games | Hanoi, Vietnam | SIngles | Gold (gold) |

== See also ==
- List of Singapore world champions in sports
