= Margot Garabedian =

Cambodian triathlete

Personal information
- Full name: Margot Morokot Garabedian
- Born: 27 January 1996 (age 30) Grenoble, France

Sport
- Country: France (–2022); Cambodia (2023–)
Medal record
Representing France
Women's triathlon
European Championships
Gold medal – first place	2015 Geneva	Mixed relay jr
Women's aquathlon
World Championships
Gold medal – first place	2021 Guijo de Granadilla	Individual
Representing Cambodia
Women's triathlon
SEA Games
Gold medal – first place	2023 Cambodia	Individual
Women's aquathlon
Asian Beach Games
Silver medal – second place	2026 Sanya	Individual
SEA Games
Gold medal – first place	2023 Cambodia	Individual

Margot Morakot Garabedian (born 27 January 1996) is a French-born Cambodian triathlete. She represented Cambodia in the triathlon at the 2023 SEA Games held in Cambodia.

== Personal life ==
She was born in Grenoble, France on 27 January 1996.

== Career ==
Margot Morokot Garabedian is a Cambodian athlete, got the first gold medal of Cambodia Triathlon Federation history 2023 SEA Games. She previously represented France until December 2022.

== International honours ==
Aquathlon
World Championship
Year	Place	Medal	Event
2021	(Spain) Guijo de Granadilla	Gold medal	Individual
SEA Games
Year	Place	Medal	Event
2023	(Cambodia) Phnom Penh	Gold medal	Individual

Triathlon
SEA Games
Year	Place	Medal	Event
2023	(Cambodia) Phnom Penh	Gold medal	Individual
